Poales is an order of flowering plants in the monocotyledons, and includes families of plants such as the grasses, bromeliads, and sedges.  Sixteen families are currently recognized to be part of Poales. The flowers are typically small, enclosed by bracts, and arranged in inflorescences The flowers of many species are wind pollinated, and the seeds usually contain starch.

23,420 species of vascular plant have been recorded in South Africa, making it the sixth most species-rich country in the world and the most species-rich country on the African continent. Of these, 153 species are considered to be threatened. Nine biomes have been described in South Africa: Fynbos, Succulent Karoo, desert, Nama Karoo, grassland, savanna, Albany thickets, the Indian Ocean coastal belt, and forests.

The 2018 South African National Biodiversity Institute's National Biodiversity Assessment plant checklist lists 35,130 taxa in the phyla Anthocerotophyta (hornworts (6)), Anthophyta (flowering plants (33534)), Bryophyta (mosses (685)), Cycadophyta (cycads (42)), Lycopodiophyta (Lycophytes(45)), Marchantiophyta (liverworts (376)), Pinophyta (conifers (33)), and Pteridophyta (cryptogams (408)).

10 families are represented in the literature. Listed taxa include species, subspecies, varieties, and forms as recorded, some of which have subsequently been allocated to other taxa as synonyms, in which cases the accepted taxon is appended to the listing. Multiple entries under alternative names reflect taxonomic revision over time.

Bromeliaceae
Family: Bromeliaceae,

Tillandsia
Genus Tillandsia:
 Tillandsia juncea (Ruiz & Pav.) Poir. not indigenous, cultivated, naturalised

Cyperaceae
Family: Cyperaceae,

Abildgaardia
Genus Abildgaardia:
 Abildgaardia filamentosa (Vahl) Lye var. holubii (C.B.Clarke) Lye, accepted as Bulbostylis scabricaulis Cherm. 
 Abildgaardia hygrophila (Gordon-Gray) Lye, indigenous
 Abildgaardia ovata (Burm.f.) Kral, indigenous
 Abildgaardia triflora (L.) Abeyw. indigenous
 Abildgaardia variegata (Gordon-Gray) Lye, accepted as Fimbristylis variegata Gordon-Gray, present

Afroscirpoides
Genus Afroscirpoides:
 Afroscirpoides dioeca (Kunth) Garcia-Madr. indigenous

Alinula
Genus Alinula:
 Alinula paradoxa (Cherm.) Goetgh. & Vorster, indigenous

Archaeocarex
Genus Archaeocarex:
 Archaeocarex ecklonii (Nees) Pissjauk. accepted as Carex capensis Thunb. indigenous
 Archaeocarex kunthiana (Kuk.) Pissjauk. accepted as Carex spartea Wahlenb. indigenous
 Archaeocarex rufus (Nees) Fedde & J.Schust. accepted as Carex ludwigii (Hochst.) Luceno & Martin-Bravo, indigenous
 Archaeocarex spartea (Wahlenb.) Pissjauk. accepted as Carex spartea Wahlenb. indigenous
 Archaeocarex thunbergii (Nees) Pissjauk. accepted as Carex capensis Thunb. endemic

Ascolepis
Genus Ascolepis:
 Ascolepis capensis (Kunth) Ridl. indigenous

Asterochaete
Genus Asterochaete:
 Asterochaete glomerata Nees, accepted as Carpha glomerata (Thunb.) Nees

Bolboschoenus
Genus Bolboschoenus:
 Bolboschoenus glaucus (Lam.) S.G.Sm. indigenous
 Bolboschoenus maritimus (L.) Palla, indigenous

Bulbostylis
Genus Bulbostylis:
 Bulbostylis boeckeleriana (Schweinf.) Beetle, indigenous
 Bulbostylis burchellii (Ficalho & Hiern) C.B.Clarke, indigenous
 Bulbostylis contexta (Nees) M.Bodard, indigenous
 Bulbostylis densa (Wall.) Hand.-Mazz. indigenous
 Bulbostylis densa (Wall.) Hand.-Mazz. subsp. afromontana (Lye) R.W.Haines, indigenous
 Bulbostylis filamentosa (Vahl) C.B.Clarke, indigenous
 Bulbostylis hispidula (Vahl) R.W.Haines, indigenous
 Bulbostylis hispidula (Vahl) R.W.Haines subsp. pyriformis (Lye) R.W.Haines, indigenous
 Bulbostylis humilis (Kunth) C.B.Clarke, indigenous
 Bulbostylis oritrephes (Ridl.) C.B.Clarke, indigenous
 Bulbostylis oritrephes(Ridl.) C.B.Clarke subsp. australis B.L.Burtt, accepted as Bulbostylis oritrephes (Ridl.) C.B.Clarke, present
 Bulbostylis parvinux C.B.Clarke, indigenous
 Bulbostylis pusilla (Hochst. ex A.Rich.) C.B.Clarke, indigenous
 Bulbostylis scabricaulis Cherm. indigenous
 Bulbostylis schlechteri C.B.Clarke, endemic
 Bulbostylis schoenoides (Kunth) C.B.Clarke, indigenous
 Bulbostylis scleropus C.B.Clarke, indigenous

Capeobolus
Genus Capeobolus:
 Capeobolus brevicaulis (C.B.Clarke) Browning, endemic

Carex
Genus Carex:
 Carex acocksii C.Archer, endemic
 Carex acutiformis Ehrh. not indigenous, naturalised
 Carex aethiopica Schkuhr, endemic
 Carex austro-africana (Kuk.) Raymond, accepted as Carex rhodesiaca Nelmes, indigenous
 Carex basutorum (Turrill) Luceno & Martin-Bravo, indigenous
 Carex bisexualis C.B.Clarke, accepted as Carex capensis Thunb. indigenous
 Carex bolusii C.B.Clarke, accepted as Carex spartea Wahlenb. indigenous
 Carex buchananii (C.B.Clarke ex C.B.Clarke) C.B.Clarke, accepted as Carex kukkoneniana Luceno & Martin-Bravo, indigenous
 Carex burchelliana Boeck. endemic
 Carex burkei (C.B.Clarke) Luceno & Martin-Bravo, indigenous
 Carex capensis Schkuhr [1], accepted as Carex capensis Thunb. indigenous
 Carex capensis Thunb. endemic
 Carex cernua Boott var. austro-africana Kuk. accepted as Carex rhodesiaca Nelmes 
 Carex clavata Thunb. endemic
 Carex cognata Kunth, indigenous
 Carex cognata Kunth var. drakensbergensis (C.B.Clarke) Kuk. accepted as Carex cognata Kunth, present
 Carex condensata C.B.Clarke, accepted as Carex zuluensis C.B.Clarke 
 Carex consanguinea Kunth, accepted as Carex divisa Huds. 
 Carex densenervosa Chiov. accepted as Carex schimperiana Boeck. indigenous
 Carex distincta (Kukkonen) Luceno & Martin-Bravo, indigenous
 Carex divisa Huds. not indigenous, naturalised
 Carex drakensbergensis C.B.Clarke, accepted as Carex cognata Kunth 
 Carex dregeana Kunth, accepted as Carex spartea Wahlenb. indigenous
 Carex dregeana Kunth var. major C.B.Clarke, accepted as Carex spartea Wahlenb. indigenous
 Carex ecklonii Nees, endemic
 Carex esenbeckiana Boeck. accepted as Carex spartea Wahlenb. indigenous
 Carex esenbeckiana Boeck. var. elongata Boeck. accepted as Carex spartea Wahlenb. indigenous
 Carex glomerabilis V.I.Krecz. indigenous
 Carex glomerata Thunb. accepted as Carex glomerabilis V.I.Krecz. 
 Carex huttoniana Kuk. accepted as Carex zuluensis C.B.Clarke 
 Carex indica Schkuhr, accepted as Carex spartea Wahlenb. indigenous
 Carex killickii Nelmes, indigenous
 Carex kukkoneniana Luceno & Martin-Bravo, indigenous
 Carex lancea (Thunb.) Baill. endemic
 Carex leporina L. not indigenous, naturalised
 Carex leribensis Nelmes, accepted as Carex glomerabilis V.I.Krecz. present
 Carex ludwigii (Hochst.) Luceno & Martin-Bravo, indigenous
 Carex merxmuelleri Podlech, accepted as Carex zuluensis C.B.Clarke, present
 Carex monotropa Nelmes, indigenous
 Carex mossii Nelmes, endemic
 Carex multispiculata Luceno & Martin-Bravo, indigenous
 Carex ovalis Gooden., a nom. illeg. synonym; see Carex leporina, above
 Carex ovata Burm.f. accepted as Abildgaardia ovata (Burm.f.) Kral 
 Carex perdensa (Kukkonen) Luceno & Martin-Bravo, endemic
 Carex pseudorufa Luceno & Martin-Bravo, endemic
 Carex pubescens Poir. accepted as Fuirena pubescens (Poir.) Kunth var. pubescens 
 Carex rainbowii Luceno et al. indigenous
 Carex ramosa Nees, accepted as Carex lancea (Thunb.) Baill. indigenous
 Carex rhodesiaca Nelmes, indigenous
 Carex rufa (Nees) Baill. accepted as Carex ludwigii (Hochst.) Luceno & Martin-Bravo, indigenous
 Carex schimperiana Boeck. indigenous
 Carex schlechteri Nelmes, accepted as Carex glomerabilis V.I.Krecz. present
 Carex schweickerdtii (Merxm. & Podlech) Luceno & Martin-Bravo, endemic
 Carex spartea Wahlenb. indigenous
 Carex spicatopaniculata Boeck. ex C.B.Clarke, indigenous
 Carex sprengelii (Nees) Boeck. accepted as Carex spartea Wahlenb. indigenous
 Carex subinflata Nelmes, indigenous
 Carex sylvatica Huds. [1], not indigenous, naturalised
 Carex uhligii K.Schum. ex C.B.Clarke, indigenous
 Carex wahlenbergiana C.B.Clarke, accepted as Carex zuluensis C.B.Clarke 
 Carex zeyheri C.B.Clarke, accepted as Carex capensis Thunb. indigenous
 Carex zuluensis C.B.Clarke, indigenous

Carpha
Genus Carpha:
 Carpha bracteosa C.B.Clarke, endemic
 Carpha capitellata (Nees) Boeck. indigenous
 Carpha filifolia C.Reid & T.H.Arnold, indigenous
 Carpha glomerata (Thunb.) Nees, endemic
 Carpha schlechteri C.B.Clarke, endemic

Chrysitrix
Genus Chrysitrix:
 Chrysitrix capensis L. var. capensis, endemic
 Chrysitrix capensis L. var. subteres C.B.Clarke, endemic
 Chrysitrix dodii C.B.Clarke, endemic
 Chrysitrix junciformis Nees, endemic

Cladium
Genus Cladium:
 Cladium mariscus (L.) Pohl, indigenous
 Cladium mariscus (L.) Pohl subsp. jamaicense (Crantz) Kuk. indigenous

Coleochloa
Genus Coleochloa:
 Coleochloa pallidior Nelmes, indigenous
 Coleochloa setifera (Ridl.) Gilly, indigenous

Costularia
Genus Costularia:
 Costularia brevicaulis C.B.Clarke, accepted as Capeobolus brevicaulis (C.B.Clarke) Browning, present
 Costularia natalensis C.B.Clarke, indigenous

Courtoisia
Genus Courtoisia:
 Courtoisia assimilis (Steud.) C.B.Clarke, accepted as Cyperus assimilis Steud. indigenous
 Courtoisia assimilis (Steud.) Maquet [1], accepted as Cyperus assimilis Steud. indigenous
 Courtoisia cyperoides (Roxb.) Nees, accepted as Cyperus pseudokyllingioides Kuk. indigenous
 Courtoisia cyperoides (Roxb.) Sojak [1], indigenous
 Courtoisina assimilis (Steud.) Maquet, accepted as Cyperus assimilis Steud. indigenous
 Courtoisina cyperoides (Roxb.) Sojak, accepted as Cyperus pseudokyllingioides Kuk. indigenous
 Courtoisina cyperoides (Roxb.) Sojak subsp. africanus (C.B.Clarke ex Kuk.) Vorster, accepted as Cyperus pseudokyllingioides Kuk. indigenous

Cyathocoma
Genus Cyathocoma:
 Cyathocoma bachmannii (Kuk.) C.Archer, endemic
 Cyathocoma ecklonii Nees, endemic
 Cyathocoma hexandra (Nees) Browning, endemic

Cyperus
Genus Cyperus:
 Cyperus albiceps Ridl. accepted as Kyllinga albiceps (Ridl.) Rendle 
 Cyperus albostriatus Schrad. indigenous
 Cyperus alopecuroides Rottb. indigenous
 Cyperus alternifolius L. subsp. flabelliformis (Rottb.) Kuk. accepted as Cyperus involucratus Rottb. 
 Cyperus amabilis Vahl, indigenous
 Cyperus amabilis Vahl var. subacaulis Kuk. accepted as Cyperus amabilis Vahl 
 Cyperus amnicola Kunth, accepted as Cyperus rupestris Kunth var. amnicola (Kunth) Kuk. 
 Cyperus angolensis Boeck. indigenous
 Cyperus aristatus Rottb. accepted as Cyperus squarrosus L. 
 Cyperus aristatus Rottb. var. atriceps Kuk. accepted as Cyperus atriceps (Kuk.) C.Archer & Goetgh. present
 Cyperus articulatus L. indigenous
 Cyperus assimilis Steud. indigenous
 Cyperus atribulbus Kuk. accepted as Pycreus atribulbus (Kuk.) Napper 
 Cyperus atriceps (Kuk.) C.Archer & Goetgh. indigenous
 Cyperus auricomus Sieber ex Spreng. accepted as Cyperus digitatus Roxb. subsp. auricomus (Sieber ex Spreng.) Kuk. 
 Cyperus austro-africanus C.Archer & Goetgh. indigenous
 Cyperus bellus Kunth, indigenous
 Cyperus betschuanus Boeck. accepted as Pycreus betschuanus (Boeck.) C.B.Clarke 
 Cyperus blepharoleptos Steud. indigenous
 Cyperus brevis Boeck. indigenous
 Cyperus brunneo-vaginatus Boeck. accepted as Cyperus marginatus Thunb. 
 Cyperus bullatus Kuk. accepted as Cyperus chersinus (N.E.Br.) Kuk. 
 Cyperus capensis (Steud.) Endl. endemic
 Cyperus capensis (Steud.) Endl. var. pseudomarlothii Kuk. forma globospica, accepted as Cyperus uitenhagensis (Steud.) C.Archer & Goetgh. 
 Cyperus capensis (Steud.) Engl. var. pseudomarlothii Kuk. accepted as Cyperus uitenhagensis (Steud.) C.Archer & Goetgh. 
 Cyperus chersinus (N.E.Br.) Kuk. indigenous
 Cyperus chrysanthus Boeck. accepted as Pycreus chrysanthus (Boeck.) C.B.Clarke 
 Cyperus compactus Lam. accepted as Cyperus obtusiflorus Vahl var. obtusiflorus 
 Cyperus compressus L. indigenous
 Cyperus congestus Vahl, indigenous
 Cyperus congestus Vahl var. brevis (Boeck.) Kuk. accepted as Cyperus brevis Boeck. 
 Cyperus congestus Vahl var. glanduliferus (C.B.Clarke) Kuk. accepted as Cyperus congestus Vahl 
 Cyperus congestus Vahl var. grandiceps Kuk. accepted as Cyperus congestus Vahl 
 Cyperus congestus Vahl var. pseudonatalensis Kuk. accepted as Cyperus congestus Vahl 
 Cyperus cooperi (C.B.Clarke) K.Schum. accepted as Cyperus congestus Vahl 
 Cyperus crassipes Vahl, indigenous
 Cyperus crinitus Poir. accepted as Ficinia crinita (Poir.) B.L.Burtt 
 Cyperus cuspidatus Kunth, indigenous
 Cyperus cyperoides (L.) Kuntze, indigenous
 Cyperus cyperoides (L.) Kuntze subsp. cyperoides, indigenous
 Cyperus cyperoides (L.) Kuntze subsp. flavus Lye, indigenous
 Cyperus cyperoides (L.) Kuntze subsp. pseudoflavus (Kuk.) Lye, indigenous
 Cyperus deciduus Boeck. indigenous
 Cyperus decurvatus (C.B.Clarke) C.Archer & Goetgh. indigenous
 Cyperus denudatus L.f. indigenous
 Cyperus denudatus L.f. var. sphaerospermus (Schrad.) Kuk. accepted as Cyperus sphaerospermus Schrad. 
 Cyperus dichrostachyus Hochst. ex A.Rich. indigenous
 Cyperus difformis L. indigenous
 Cyperus digitatus Roxb. indigenous
 Cyperus digitatus Roxb. subsp. auricomus (Sieber ex Spreng.) Kuk. indigenous
 Cyperus distans L.f. indigenous
 Cyperus distans L.f. var. niger C.B.Clarke, accepted as Cyperus keniensis Kuk. 
 Cyperus dives Delile, indigenous
 Cyperus dubius Rottb. indigenous
 Cyperus dubius Rottb. var. dubius, indigenous
 Cyperus durus Kunth, endemic
 Cyperus elegantulus Steud. accepted as Pycreus niger (Ruiz & Pav.) Cufod. subsp. elegantulus (Steud.) Lye 
 Cyperus elephantinus (C.B.Clarke) Kuk. endemic
 Cyperus emarginatus Schrad. accepted as Cyperus longus L. var. tenuiflorus (Rottb.) Boeck. present
 Cyperus eragrostis Lam. not indigenous, naturalised
 Cyperus esculentus L. indigenous
 Cyperus esculentus L. var. cyclolepis Kuk. accepted as Cyperus esculentus L. var. esculentus, present
 Cyperus esculentus L. var. esculentus, indigenous
 Cyperus esculentus L. var. nervoso-striatus (Turrill) Kuk. accepted as Cyperus esculentus L. var. esculentus, present
 Cyperus fastigiatus Rottb. indigenous
 Cyperus fenzelianus K.Schum. accepted as Cyperus rotundus L. subsp. tuberosus (Rottb.) Kuk. 
 Cyperus fenzelianus Steud. accepted as Cyperus longus L. var. tenuiflorus (Rottb.) Boeck. 
 Cyperus flabelliformis Rottb. accepted as Cyperus involucratus Rottb. 
 Cyperus flavescens L. accepted as Pycreus flavescens (L.) P.Beauv. ex Rchb. 
 Cyperus fulgens C.B.Clarke, indigenous
 Cyperus fulgens C.B.Clarke var. contractus Kuk. accepted as Cyperus palmatus (Lye) C.Archer & Goetgh. indigenous
 Cyperus globosus All. var. nilagirica (Steud.) C.B.Clarke, accepted as Pycreus betschuanus (Boeck.) C.B.Clarke 
 Cyperus haematocephalus Boeck. ex C.B.Clarke, indigenous
 Cyperus hirsutus P.J.Bergius, accepted as Fuirena hirsuta (P.J.Bergius) P.L.Forbes 
 Cyperus holostigma C.B.Clarke ex Schweinf. accepted as Cyperus schinzii Boeck. 
 Cyperus imbricatus Retz. indigenous
 Cyperus immensus C.B.Clarke, accepted as Cyperus dives Delile, present
 Cyperus indecorus Kunth, indigenous
 Cyperus indecorus Kunth var. decurvatus (C.B.Clarke) Kuk. accepted as Cyperus decurvatus (C.B.Clarke) C.Archer & Goetgh. indigenous
 Cyperus indecorus Kunth var. dinteri Kuk. accepted as Cyperus decurvatus (C.B.Clarke) C.Archer & Goetgh. 
 Cyperus indecorus Kunth var. indecorus, endemic
 Cyperus indecorus Kunth var. inflatus (C.B.Clarke) Kuk. indigenous
 Cyperus indecorus Kunth var. namaquensis Kuk. indigenous
 Cyperus intactus Vahl, accepted as Pycreus intactus (Vahl) J.Raynal 
 Cyperus involucratus Rottb. indigenous
 Cyperus iria L. indigenous
 Cyperus isocladus Kunth, accepted as Cyperus prolifer Lam. 
 Cyperus keniensis Kuk. indigenous
 Cyperus kirkii C.B.Clarke, indigenous
 Cyperus kyllingiella Larridon, indigenous
 Cyperus laevigatus L. indigenous
 Cyperus laevigatus L. subsp. laevigatus, indigenous
 Cyperus laevigatus L. var. subaphyllus (Boeck.) Kuk. accepted as Cyperus laevigatus L. 
 Cyperus lapidicolus Kuk. accepted as Cyperus semitrifidus Schrad. 
 Cyperus lateriflorus Steud. accepted as Cyperus longus L. var. tenuiflorus (Rottb.) Boeck. present
 Cyperus latifolius Poir. indigenous
 Cyperus latifolius Poir. var. angustifolius Hochst. accepted as Cyperus latifolius Poir. 
 Cyperus latifolius Poir. var. austro-africanus Kuk. accepted as Cyperus latifolius Poir. 
 Cyperus leptocladus Kunth, indigenous
 Cyperus leucoloma Nees, accepted as Isolepis leucoloma (Nees) C.Archer, present
 Cyperus longus L. indigenous
 Cyperus longus L. subsp. tenuiflorus (Rottb.) Kuk. accepted as Cyperus longus L. var. tenuiflorus (Rottb.) Boeck. 
 Cyperus longus L. var. longus, indigenous
 Cyperus longus L. var. tenuiflorus (Rottb.) Boeck. indigenous
 Cyperus macer (Kunth) K.Schum. accepted as Cyperus cyperoides (L.) Kuntze subsp. pseudoflavus (Kuk.) Lye 
 Cyperus macranthus Boeck. accepted as Pycreus macranthus (Boeck.) C.B.Clarke 
 Cyperus macrocarpus (Kunth) Boeck. indigenous
 Cyperus macrocarpus (Kunth) Boeck. var. pseudoflavus Kuk. accepted as Cyperus cyperoides (L.) Kuntze subsp. pseudoflavus (Kuk.) Lye 
 Cyperus macrocarpus (Kunth) Boeck. var. submacrocarpus Kuk. accepted as Cyperus macrocarpus (Kunth) Boeck. 
 Cyperus macrostachyos Lam. accepted as Pycreus macrostachyos (Lam.) J.Raynal 
 Cyperus maculatus Boeck. indigenous
 Cyperus margaritaceus Vahl, indigenous
 Cyperus margaritaceus Vahl var. margaritaceus, indigenous
 Cyperus marginatus Thunb. indigenous
 Cyperus maritimus Poir. accepted as Cyperus crassipes Vahl 
 Cyperus marlothii Boeck. indigenous
 Cyperus melanospermus (Nees) Valck.Sur, accepted as Kyllinga melanosperma Nees 
 Cyperus meyerianus Kunth, indigenous
 Cyperus michelianus (L.) Link subsp. pygmaeus (Rottb.) Asch. & Graebn. accepted as Cyperus pygmaeus Rottb. 
 Cyperus micromegas Nees, accepted as Isolepis levynsiana Muasya & D.A.Simpson 
 Cyperus minutus Roth, accepted as Isolepis marginata (Thunb.) A.Dietr. 
 Cyperus monostachyos L. accepted as Abildgaardia ovata (Burm.f.) Kral 
 Cyperus multiglumis Turrill, accepted as Cyperus semitrifidus Schrad. 
 Cyperus muricatus Kuk. accepted as Pycreus muricatus (Kuk.) Napper 
 Cyperus mwinilungensis Podlech var. maior Podlech, accepted as Cyperus mwinilungensis Podlech 
 Cyperus natalensis Hochst. indigenous
 Cyperus nervoso-striatus Turrill, accepted as Cyperus esculentus L. var. esculentus, present
 Cyperus nigricans Steud. accepted as Pycreus nigricans (Steud.) C.B.Clarke 
 Cyperus nitens Vahl, accepted as Pycreus pumilus (L.) Nees 
 Cyperus nitidus Lam. accepted as Pycreus nitidus (Lam.) J.Raynal 
 Cyperus niveus Retz. var. flavissimus (Schrad.) Lye, accepted as Cyperus obtusiflorus Vahl var. flavissimus (Schrad.) Boeck. 
 Cyperus niveus Retz. var. leucocephalus (Kunth) Fosberg, accepted as Cyperus obtusiflorus Vahl var. obtusiflorus 
 Cyperus nudicaulis Poir. accepted as Cyperus pectinatus Vahl 
 Cyperus obtusiflorus Vahl, indigenous
 Cyperus obtusiflorus Vahl var. flavissimus (Schrad.) Boeck. indigenous
 Cyperus obtusiflorus Vahl var. obtusiflorus, indigenous
 Cyperus obtusiflorus Vahl var. sphaerocephalus (Vahl) Kuk. accepted as Cyperus obtusiflorus Vahl var. flavissimus (Schrad.) Boeck. present
 Cyperus owanii Boeck. endemic
 Cyperus owanii Boeck. var. rogersii Kuk. accepted as Cyperus owanii Boeck. present
 Cyperus palmatus (Lye) C.Archer & Goetgh. indigenous
 Cyperus papyrus L. indigenous
 Cyperus papyrus L. subsp. papyrus, indigenous
 Cyperus parvinux C.B.Clarke, indigenous
 Cyperus pectinatus Vahl, indigenous
 Cyperus pelophilus Ridl. accepted as Pycreus pelophilus (Ridl.) C.B.Clarke 
 Cyperus polystachyos Rottb. accepted as Pycreus polystachyos (Rottb.) P.Beauv. var. polystachyos 
 Cyperus prasinus Kunth, accepted as Cyperus leptocladus Kunth 
 Cyperus procerus Rottb. indigenous
 Cyperus prolifer Lam. indigenous
 Cyperus prolifer Lam. var. isocladus (Kunth) Kuk. accepted as Cyperus prolifer Lam. 
 Cyperus pseudokyllingioides Kuk. indigenous
 Cyperus pseudokyllingioides Kuk. var. africanus Kuk. accepted as Cyperus pseudokyllingioides Kuk. indigenous
 Cyperus pseudoleptocladus Kuk. accepted as Cyperus glaucophyllus Boeck. indigenous
 Cyperus pseudoleptocladus Kuk. var. polycarpus Kuk. accepted as Cyperus glaucophyllus Boeck. 
 Cyperus pseudoniveus Boeck. accepted as Cyperus margaritaceus Vahl var. margaritaceus 
 Cyperus pseudovestitus (C.B.Clarke) Kuk. indigenous
 Cyperus pulcher Thunb. endemic
 Cyperus pumilus L. accepted as Pycreus pumilus (L.) Nees 
 Cyperus pumilus L. var. patens (Vahl) Kuk. accepted as Pycreus pumilus (L.) Nees 
 Cyperus purpureus Boeck. accepted as Cyperus schinzii Boeck. 
 Cyperus pygmaeus Rottb. indigenous
 Cyperus radiatus Vahl, accepted as Cyperus imbricatus Retz. 
 Cyperus remotiflorus Kuk. accepted as Cyperus bellus Kunth 
 Cyperus rigidifolius Steud. indigenous
 Cyperus rothianus Roem. & Schult. accepted as Isolepis marginata (Thunb.) A.Dietr. 
 Cyperus rotundus L. indigenous
 Cyperus rotundus L. subsp. rotundus, indigenous
 Cyperus rotundus L. subsp. rotundus var. platystachys, accepted as Cyperus rotundus L. subsp. tuberosus (Rottb.) Kuk. present
 Cyperus rotundus L. subsp. tuberosus (Rottb.) Kuk. indigenous
 Cyperus rotundus L. var. tuberosus (Rottb.) Kuk. accepted as Cyperus rotundus L. subsp. tuberosus (Rottb.) Kuk. 
 Cyperus rubicundus Vahl, indigenous
 Cyperus rupestris Kunth, indigenous
 Cyperus rupestris Kunth var. amnicola (Kunth) Kuk. endemic
 Cyperus rupestris Kunth var. parvinux (C.B.Clarke) Kuk. accepted as Cyperus parvinux C.B.Clarke, indigenous
 Cyperus rupestris Kunth var. rupestris, indigenous
 Cyperus schinzii Boeck. indigenous
 Cyperus schlechteri C.B.Clarke, indigenous
 Cyperus semitrifidus Schrad. indigenous
 Cyperus semitrifidus Schrad. var. multiglumis (Turrill) Kuk. accepted as Cyperus semitrifidus Schrad. 
 Cyperus sensilis Baijnath, endemic
 Cyperus sesquiflorus (Torr.) Mattf. & Kuk. accepted as Kyllinga odorata Vahl 
 Cyperus sexangularis Nees, indigenous
 Cyperus smithii McLean, accepted as Cyperus leptocladus Kunth 
 Cyperus solidus Kunth, indigenous
 Cyperus sphacelatus Rottb. var. tenuior C.B.Clarke, accepted as Cyperus zollingeri Steud. 
 Cyperus sphaerocephalus Vahl, accepted as Cyperus obtusiflorus Vahl var. flavissimus (Schrad.) Boeck. 
 Cyperus sphaerospermus Schrad. indigenous
 Cyperus sphaerospermus Schrad. var. minor Schrad. accepted as Cyperus sphaerospermus Schrad. present
 Cyperus squarrosus L. indigenous
 Cyperus subparadoxus Kuk. accepted as Alinula paradoxa (Cherm.) Goetgh. & Vorster 
 Cyperus subumbellatus Kuk. accepted as Cyperus cyperoides (L.) Kuntze subsp. flavus Lye 
 Cyperus tabularis Schrad. endemic
 Cyperus tenax Boeck. indigenous
 Cyperus tenellus L.f. accepted as Isolepis levynsiana Muasya & D.A.Simpson, endemic
 Cyperus tenellus L.f. var. gracilis Nees, accepted as Cyperus tenellus L.f. var. tenellus, present
 Cyperus tenellus L.f. var. micromegas (Nees) F.Muell. accepted as Isolepis levynsiana Muasya & D.A.Simpson, endemic
 Cyperus teneriffae Poir. accepted as Cyperus rubicundus Vahl 
 Cyperus teneriffae Poir. var. succulentus Dinter ex Kuk. accepted as Cyperus rubicundus Vahl 
 Cyperus tenuispica Steud. indigenous
 Cyperus textilis Thunb. endemic
 Cyperus thorncroftii McClean, accepted as Cyperus kirkii C.B.Clarke, present
 Cyperus thunbergii Vahl, endemic
 Cyperus triflorus L. accepted as Abildgaardia triflora (L.) Abeyw. 
 Cyperus tuberosus Rottb. accepted as Cyperus rotundus L. subsp. tuberosus (Rottb.) Kuk. 
 Cyperus turrillii Kuk. indigenous
 Cyperus uitenhagensis (Steud.) C.Archer & Goetgh. indigenous
 Cyperus uncinatus Poir. accepted as Cyperus cuspidatus Kunth 
 Cyperus unioloides R.Br. accepted as Pycreus unioloides (R.Br.) Urb. 
 Cyperus usitatus Burch. indigenous
 Cyperus usitatus Burch. subsp. palmatus Lye, accepted as Cyperus palmatus (Lye) C.Archer & Goetgh. indigenous
 Cyperus usitatus Burch. var. macrobulbus Kuk. accepted as Cyperus usitatus Burch. indigenous
 Cyperus vegetus Willd. accepted as Cyperus eragrostis Lam. 
 Cyperus vestitus Hochst. indigenous
 Cyperus vorsteri K.L.Wilson, endemic
 Cyperus x turbatus Baijnath, endemic
 Cyperus zollingeri Steud. indigenous

Dracoscirpoides
Genus Dracoscirpoides:
 Dracoscirpoides falsa (C.B.Clarke) Muasya, indigenous
 Dracoscirpoides ficinioides (Kunth) Muasya, indigenous
 Dracoscirpoides surculosa Muasya, Reynders & Goetgh. indigenous

Eleocharis
Genus Eleocharis:
 Eleocharis acutangula (Roxb.) Schult. indigenous
 Eleocharis atropurpurea (Retz.) J.Presl & C.Presl, indigenous
 Eleocharis caduca (Delile) Schult. indigenous
 Eleocharis dregeana Steud. indigenous
 Eleocharis dulcis (Burm.f.) Trin. ex Hensch. indigenous
 Eleocharis geniculata (L.) Roem. & Schult. indigenous
 Eleocharis intricata Kuk. accepted as Eleocharis caduca (Delile) Schult. present
 Eleocharis limosa (Schrad.) Schult. indigenous
 Eleocharis mutata (L.) Roem. & Schult. indigenous
 Eleocharis schlechteri C.B.Clarke, indigenous
 Eleocharis variegata (Poir.) C.Presl, indigenous

Epischoenus
Genus Epischoenus:
 Epischoenus adnatus Levyns, endemic
 Epischoenus cernuus Levyns, endemic
 Epischoenus complanatus Levyns, endemic
 Epischoenus dregeanus (Boeck.) Levyns, endemic
 Epischoenus gracilis Levyns, endemic
 Epischoenus lucidus (C.B.Clarke) Levyns, endemic
 Epischoenus quadrangularis (Boeck.) C.B.Clarke, endemic
 Epischoenus villosus Levyns, endemic

Ficinia
Genus Ficinia:
 Ficinia acrostachys (Steud.) C.B.Clarke, indigenous
 Ficinia acuminata (Nees) Nees, endemic
 Ficinia albicans Nees, endemic
 Ficinia anceps Nees, endemic
 Ficinia angustifolia (Schrad.) Levyns [2], endemic
 Ficinia anysbergensis Muasya, endemic
 Ficinia arenicola T.H.Arnold & Gordon-Gray, indigenous
 Ficinia arenicola T.H.Arnold & Gordon-Gray var. arenicola, endemic
 Ficinia arenicola T.H.Arnold & Gordon-Gray var. erecta T.H.Arnold & Gordon-Gray, endemic
 Ficinia argyropa Nees, endemic
 Ficinia arnoldii Tshiila & Muasya, endemic
 Ficinia bergiana Kunth, accepted as Ficinia tristachya (Rottb.) Nees, present
 Ficinia brevifolia Kunth, endemic
 Ficinia bulbosa (L.) Nees, endemic
 Ficinia capillifolia (Schrad.) C.B.Clarke, endemic
 Ficinia capitella (Thunb.) Nees, endemic
 Ficinia cedarbergensis T.H.Arnold & Gordon-Gray, endemic
 Ficinia cinnamomea C.B.Clarke, indigenous
 Ficinia compasbergensis Drege, endemic
 Ficinia crinita (Poir.) B.L.Burtt, endemic
 Ficinia dasystachys C.B.Clarke, endemic
 Ficinia decidua H.Pfeiff. accepted as Ficinia monticola Kunth, present
 Ficinia deusta (P.J.Bergius) Levyns, endemic
 Ficinia distans C.B.Clarke, endemic
 Ficinia dunensis Levyns, endemic
 Ficinia dura Turrill, endemic
 Ficinia ecklonea (Steud.) Nees, endemic
 Ficinia elatior Levyns, endemic
 Ficinia esterhuyseniae Muasya, endemic
 Ficinia fascicularis Nees, endemic
 Ficinia fastigiata (Thunb.) Nees, endemic
 Ficinia filiculmea B.L.Burtt, indigenous
 Ficinia filiformis (Lam.) Schrad. endemic
 Ficinia gracilis Schrad. indigenous
 Ficinia grandiflora T.H.Arnold & Gordon-Gray, endemic
 Ficinia gydomontana T.H.Arnold, endemic
 Ficinia indica (Lam.) H.Pfeiff. endemic
 Ficinia ixioides Nees, indigenous
 Ficinia ixioides Nees subsp. glabra T.H.Arnold & Gordon-Gray, endemic
 Ficinia ixioides Nees subsp. ixioides, endemic
 Ficinia jardinei Muasya & C.H.Stirt. indigenous
 Ficinia laciniata (Thunb.) Nees, endemic
 Ficinia laevis (Vahl) Nees, endemic
 Ficinia lateralis (Vahl) Kunth, endemic
 Ficinia latifolia T.H.Arnold & Gordon-Gray, endemic
 Ficinia levynsiae T.H.Arnold & Gordon-Gray, endemic
 Ficinia limosa Levyns, accepted as Ficinia pygmaea Boeck. 
 Ficinia macowanii C.B.Clarke, indigenous
 Ficinia micrantha C.B.Clarke, endemic
 Ficinia minutiflora C.B.Clarke, endemic
 Ficinia montana Tshiila & Muasya, endemic
 Ficinia monticola Kunth, endemic
 Ficinia mucronata C.B.Clarke, endemic
 Ficinia nigrescens (Schrad.) J.Raynal, indigenous
 Ficinia nodosa (Rottb.) Goetgh. Muasya & D.A.Simpson, indigenous
 Ficinia oligantha (Steud.) J.Raynal, endemic
 Ficinia overbergensis Muasya & C.H.Stirt. indigenous
 Ficinia pallens (Schrad.) Nees, indigenous
 Ficinia pallens (Schrad.) Nees var. lithosperma (Boeck.) T.H.Arnold & Gordon-Gray, endemic
 Ficinia pallens (Schrad.) Nees var. pallens, endemic
 Ficinia paradoxa (Schrad.) Nees, endemic
 Ficinia petrophila T.H.Arnold & Gordon-Gray, endemic
 Ficinia pinguior C.B.Clarke, endemic
 Ficinia polystachya Levyns, endemic
 Ficinia praemorsa Nees, endemic
 Ficinia pygmaea Boeck. endemic
 Ficinia quartzicola Muasya & Helme, indigenous
 Ficinia quinquangularis Boeck. endemic
 Ficinia radiata (L.f.) Kunth, endemic
 Ficinia ramosissima Kunth, endemic
 Ficinia repens (Nees) Kunth, endemic
 Ficinia rigida Levyns, endemic
 Ficinia secunda (Vahl) Kunth, endemic
 Ficinia stolonifera Boeck. indigenous
 Ficinia sylvatica Kunth, accepted as Ficinia trispicata (L.f.) Druce, present
 Ficinia tenuifolia Kunth, accepted as Ficinia filiformis (Lam.) Schrad. present
 Ficinia trichodes (Schrad.) Benth. & Hook.f. endemic
 Ficinia trispicata (L.f.) Druce, endemic
 Ficinia tristachya (Rottb.) Nees, endemic
 Ficinia truncata (Thunb.) Schrad. endemic
 Ficinia undosa B.L.Burtt, accepted as Ficinia gracilis Schrad. present
 Ficinia zeyheri Boeck. endemic

Fimbristylis
Genus Fimbristylis:
 Fimbristylis aphylla Steud. indigenous
 Fimbristylis bisumbellata (Forssk.) Bubani, indigenous
 Fimbristylis bivalvis (Lam.) Lye, indigenous
 Fimbristylis complanata (Retz.) Link, indigenous
 Fimbristylis complanata (Retz.) Link subsp. complanata, indigenous
 Fimbristylis dichotoma (L.) Vahl [9], indigenous
 Fimbristylis dichotoma (L.) Vahl subsp. dichotoma, indigenous
 Fimbristylis ferruginea (L.) Vahl, indigenous
 Fimbristylis microcarya F.Muell. indigenous
 Fimbristylis obtusifolia (Lam.) Kunth [1], accepted as Fimbristylis dichotoma (L.) Vahl subsp. dichotoma, indigenous
 Fimbristylis squarrosa Vahl, indigenous
 Fimbristylis variegata Gordon-Gray, endemic
 Fimbristylis x dregeana Kunth, endemic

Fuirena
Genus Fuirena:
 Fuirena bullifera J.Raynal & Roessler, indigenous
 Fuirena ciliaris (L.) Roxb. indigenous
 Fuirena ciliaris (L.) Roxb. var. ciliaris, indigenous
 Fuirena coerulescens Steud. indigenous
 Fuirena ecklonii Nees, endemic
 Fuirena enodis C.B.Clarke, accepted as Fuirena coerulescens Steud. present
 Fuirena gracilis Kunth, accepted as Fuirena coerulescens Steud. present
 Fuirena hirsuta (P.J.Bergius) P.L.Forbes, indigenous
 Fuirena leptostachya Oliv. indigenous
 Fuirena leptostachya Oliv. forma leptostachya, indigenous
 Fuirena leptostachya Oliv. forma nudiflora Lye, indigenous
 Fuirena obcordata P.L.Forbes, indigenous
 Fuirena pachyrrhiza Ridl. indigenous
 Fuirena pubescens (Poir.) Kunth, indigenous
 Fuirena pubescens (Poir.) Kunth var. pubescens, indigenous
 Fuirena stricta Steud. indigenous
 Fuirena stricta Steud. subsp. chlorocarpa (Ridl.) Lye, accepted as Fuirena stricta Steud. var. chlorocarpa (Ridl.) Kuk. 
 Fuirena stricta Steud. var. stricta, indigenous
 Fuirena tenuis P.L.Forbes, indigenous
 Fuirena umbellata Rottb. indigenous

Hellmuthia
Genus Hellmuthia:
 Hellmuthia membranacea (Thunb.) R.W.Haines & Lye, endemic

Holoschoenus
Genus Holoschoenus:
 Holoschoenus thunbergii (Schrad.) A.Dietr. accepted as Scirpoides thunbergii (Schrad.) Sojak, indigenous

Isolepis
Genus Isolepis:
 Isolepis aciformis (B.Nord.) J.Raynal, accepted as Isolepis hemiuncialis (C.B.Clarke) J.Raynal, present
 Isolepis angelica B.L.Burtt, indigenous
 Isolepis antarctica (L.) Roem. & Schult. [1], endemic
 Isolepis brevicaulis (Levyns) J.Raynal, indigenous
 Isolepis bulbifera (Boeck.) Muasya, endemic
 Isolepis capensis Muasya, endemic
 Isolepis cernua (Vahl) Roem. & Schult. indigenous
 Isolepis cernua (Vahl) Roem. & Schult. var. cernua, indigenous
 Isolepis cernua (Vahl) Roem. & Schult. var. setiformis (Benth.) Muasya, indigenous
 Isolepis costata Hochst. ex A.Rich. indigenous
 Isolepis diabolica (Steud.) Schrad. endemic
 Isolepis digitata Schrad. endemic
 Isolepis dioeca Kunth, accepted as Afroscirpoides dioeca (Kunth) Garcia-Madr. indigenous
 Isolepis expallescens Kunth, endemic
 Isolepis fluitans (L.) R.Br. indigenous
 Isolepis fluitans (L.) R.Br. var. fluitans, indigenous
 Isolepis hemiuncialis (C.B.Clarke) J.Raynal, indigenous
 Isolepis hystrix (Thunb.) Nees [2], endemic
 Isolepis incomtula Nees, endemic
 Isolepis inconspicua (Levyns) J.Raynal, endemic
 Isolepis inyangensis Muasya & Goetgh. indigenous
 Isolepis karroica (C.B.Clarke) J.Raynal, indigenous
 Isolepis leptostachya Kunth, endemic
 Isolepis leucoloma (Nees) C.Archer, endemic
 Isolepis levynsiana Muasya & D.A.Simpson, endemic
 Isolepis ludwigii (Steud.) Kunth, endemic
 Isolepis marginata (Thunb.) A.Dietr. indigenous
 Isolepis minuta (Turrill) J.Raynal, endemic
 Isolepis namaquana Muasya & J.Viljoen, indigenous
 Isolepis natans (Thunb.) A.Dietr. indigenous
 Isolepis prolifera (Rottb.) R.Br. indigenous
 Isolepis pusilla Kunth, endemic
 Isolepis rubicunda (Nees) Kunth, endemic
 Isolepis sepulcralis Steud. indigenous
 Isolepis setacea (L.) R.Br. [2], indigenous
 Isolepis sororia Kunth, endemic
 Isolepis striata (Nees) Kunth, endemic
 Isolepis tenuis (Spreng.) Schrad. accepted as Isolepis pusilla Kunth, present
 Isolepis tenuissima (Nees) Kunth, endemic
 Isolepis thunbergii Schrad. accepted as Scirpoides thunbergii (Schrad.) Sojak, indigenous
 Isolepis trachysperma Nees, indigenous
 Isolepis venustula Kunth, endemic
 Isolepis verrucosula (Steud.) Nees, accepted as Isolepis cernua (Vahl) Roem. & Schult. var. setiformis (Benth.) Muasya, present
 Isolepis x pellocolea B.L.Burtt, endemic

Kobresia
Genus Kobresia:
 Kobresia basutorum (Turrill) T.Koyama, accepted as Carex basutorum (Turrill) Luceno & Martin-Bravo, indigenous
 Kobresia buchananii (C.B.Clarke) T.Koyama, accepted as Carex kukkoneniana Luceno & Martin-Bravo, indigenous
 Kobresia ecklonii (Nees) T.Koyama, accepted as Carex capensis Thunb. endemic
 Kobresia filiforme (Kuk.) T.Koyama, accepted as Carex killickii Nelmes, indigenous
 Kobresia kunthiana (Kuk.) T.Koyama, accepted as Carex spartea Wahlenb. indigenous
 Kobresia lancea (Thunb.) T.Koyama, accepted as Carex lancea (Thunb.) Baill. indigenous
 Kobresia lehmannii (Nees) T.Koyama, accepted as Carex uhligii K.Schum. ex C.B.Clarke, indigenous
 Kobresia lehmannii (Nees) T.Koyama var. schimperiana (Boeck.) T.Koyama, accepted as Carex schimperiana Boeck. indigenous
 Kobresia rufa (Nees) T.Koyama, accepted as Carex ludwigii (Hochst.) Luceno & Martin-Bravo, indigenous
 Kobresia schweickerdtii (Merxm. & Podlech) T.Koyama, accepted as Carex schweickerdtii (Merxm. & Podlech) Luceno & Martin-Bravo, indigenous
 Kobresia spartea (Wahlenb.) T.Koyama, accepted as Carex spartea Wahlenb. indigenous
 Kobresia thunbergii (Nees) T.Koyama, accepted as Carex capensis Thunb. indigenous

Kyllinga
Genus Kyllinga:
 Kyllinga alata Nees, indigenous
 Kyllinga alba Nees, indigenous
 Kyllinga alba Nees subsp. alba, indigenous
 Kyllinga brevifolia Rottb. indigenous
 Kyllinga brevifolia Rottb. var. brevifolia, indigenous
 Kyllinga cyperoides Roxb. accepted as Cyperus pseudokyllingioides Kuk. indigenous
 Kyllinga elatior Kunth, indigenous
 Kyllinga erecta Schumach. indigenous
 Kyllinga erecta Schumach. var. erecta, indigenous
 Kyllinga intricata Cherm. accepted as Kyllinga erecta Schumach. var. erecta, present
 Kyllinga melanosperma Nees, indigenous
 Kyllinga melanosperma Nees var. melanosperma, indigenous
 Kyllinga odorata Vahl, indigenous
 Kyllinga pauciflora Ridl. indigenous
 Kyllinga polyphylla Willd. ex Kunth, indigenous
 Kyllinga pulchella Kunth, indigenous
 Kyllinga x nemoralis (G.Forst. & J.R.Forst.) Dandy ex Hutch. & Dalziel, indigenous

Kyllingiella
Genus Kyllingiella:
 Kyllingiella microcephala (Steud.) R.W.Haines & Lye, accepted as Cyperus kyllingiella Larridon, indigenous

Lipocarpha
Genus Lipocarpha:
 Lipocarpha chinensis (Osbeck) J.Kern, indigenous
 Lipocarpha hemisphaerica (Roth) Goetgh. indigenous
 Lipocarpha micrantha (Vahl) G.C.Tucker, indigenous
 Lipocarpha nana (A.Rich.) Cherm. indigenous
 Lipocarpha rehmannii (Ridl.) Goetgh. indigenous

Macrochaetium
Genus Macrochaetium:
 Macrochaetium dregei Steud. accepted as Cyathocoma hexandra (Nees) Browning, present
 Macrochaetium ecklonii (Nees) Levyns, accepted as Cyathocoma ecklonii Nees, present
 Macrochaetium hexandrum (Nees) Pfeiff. accepted as Cyathocoma hexandra (Nees) Browning, present

Mariscus
Genus Mariscus:
 Mariscus aristatus (Rottb.) Cherm. var. atriceps (Kuk.) Podlech, accepted as Cyperus atriceps (Kuk.) C.Archer & Goetgh. indigenous
 Mariscus assimilis (Steud.) Podlech, accepted as Cyperus assimilis Steud. indigenous
 Mariscus cyperoides (Roxb.) A.Dietr. accepted as Cyperus pseudokyllingioides Kuk. indigenous
 Mariscus cyperoides (Roxb.) A.Dietr. subsp. africanus (Kuk.) Podlech, accepted as Cyperus pseudokyllingioides Kuk. indigenous
 Mariscus dregeanus Kunth, accepted as Cyperus austro-africanus C.Archer & Goetgh. indigenous
 Mariscus gueinzii C.B.Clarke, accepted as Cyperus solidus Kunth, present
 Mariscus indecorus (Kunth) Podlech, accepted as Cyperus indecorus Kunth var. indecorus 
 Mariscus solidus (Kunth) Vorster, accepted as Cyperus solidus Kunth 
 Mariscus sumatrensis (Retz.) J.Raynal, accepted as Cyperus cyperoides (L.) Kuntze subsp. cyperoides 
 Mariscus uitenhagensis Steud. accepted as Cyperus uitenhagensis (Steud.) C.Archer & Goetgh. indigenous

Neesenbeckia
Genus Neesenbeckia:
 Neesenbeckia punctoria (Vahl) Levyns, endemic

Oxycaryum
Genus Oxycaryum:
 Oxycaryum cubense (Poepp. & Kunth) Palla, accepted as Cyperus blepharoleptos Steud. indigenous

Pseudomariscus
Genus Pseudomariscus:
 Pseudomariscus cyperoides (Roxb.) Rauschert, accepted as Cyperus pseudokyllingioides Kuk. indigenous

Pseudoschoenus
Genus Pseudoschoenus:
 Pseudoschoenus inanis (Thunb.) Oteng-Yeb. indigenous

Pycreus
Genus Pycreus:
 Pycreus atribulbus (Kuk.) Napper, indigenous
 Pycreus betschuanus (Boeck.) C.B.Clarke, indigenous
 Pycreus chrysanthus (Boeck.) C.B.Clarke, indigenous
 Pycreus cooperi C.B.Clarke, indigenous
 Pycreus flavescens (L.) P.Beauv. ex Rchb. indigenous
 Pycreus flavescens (L.) Rchb. subsp. flavescens, indigenous
 Pycreus intactus (Vahl) J.Raynal, indigenous
 Pycreus macranthus (Boeck.) C.B.Clarke, indigenous
 Pycreus macrostachyos (Lam.) J.Raynal, indigenous
 Pycreus mundii Nees, indigenous
 Pycreus muricatus (Kuk.) Napper, indigenous
 Pycreus niger (Ruiz & Pav.) Cufod. indigenous
 Pycreus niger (Ruiz & Pav.) Cufod. subsp. elegantulus (Steud.) Lye, indigenous
 Pycreus nigricans (Steud.) C.B.Clarke, indigenous
 Pycreus nitidus (Lam.) J.Raynal, indigenous
 Pycreus oakfortensis C.B.Clarke, indigenous
 Pycreus pelophilus (Ridl.) C.B.Clarke, indigenous
 Pycreus permutatus (Boeck.) Napper, indigenous
 Pycreus polystachyos (Rottb.) P.Beauv. indigenous
 Pycreus polystachyos (Rottb.) P.Beauv. var. polystachyos, indigenous
 Pycreus pumilus (L.) Nees, indigenous
 Pycreus rehmannianus C.B.Clarke, indigenous
 Pycreus sanguinolentus (Vahl) Nees, indigenous
 Pycreus unioloides (R.Br.) Urb. indigenous

Rhynchospora
Genus Rhynchospora:
 Rhynchospora barrosiana Guagl. indigenous
 Rhynchospora brownii Roem. & Schult. indigenous
 Rhynchospora gracillima Thwaites, indigenous
 Rhynchospora gracillima Thwaites subsp. subquadrata (Cherm.) J.Raynal, indigenous
 Rhynchospora holoschoenoides (Rich.) Herter, indigenous
 Rhynchospora perrieri Cherm. indigenous
 Rhynchospora rubra (Lour.) Makino, indigenous
 Rhynchospora rubra (Lour.) Makino subsp. africana J.Raynal, indigenous
 Rhynchospora rugosa (Vahl) Gale subsp. brownii (Roem. & Schult.) T.Koyama, accepted as Rhynchospora brownii Roem. & Schult. indigenous
 Rhynchospora spectabilis Hochst. indigenous

Schoenoplectus
Genus Schoenoplectus:
 Schoenoplectus articulatus (L.) Palla, indigenous
 Schoenoplectus brachyceras (Hochst. ex A.Rich.) Lye, indigenous
 Schoenoplectus confusus (N.E.Br.) Lye, indigenous
 Schoenoplectus confusus (N.E.Br.) Lye subsp. natalitius Browning, endemic
 Schoenoplectus corymbosus (Roth ex Roem. & Schult.) J.Raynal, indigenous
 Schoenoplectus corymbosus (Roth ex Roem. & Schult.) J.Raynal var. brachyceras (A.Rich.) Lye, accepted as Schoenoplectus brachyceras (Hochst. ex A.Rich.) Lye, present
 Schoenoplectus decipiens (Nees) J.Raynal, indigenous
 Schoenoplectus erectus (Poir.) Palla ex J.Raynal, indigenous
 Schoenoplectus leucanthus (Boeck.) J.Raynal, indigenous
 Schoenoplectus muricinux (C.B.Clarke) J.Raynal, indigenous
 Schoenoplectus muriculatus (Kuk.) Browning, indigenous
 Schoenoplectus paludicola (Kunth) Palla, endemic
 Schoenoplectus patentiglumis Hayas. indigenous
 Schoenoplectus pulchellus (Kunth) J.Raynal, indigenous
 Schoenoplectus scirpoides (Schrad.) Browning, indigenous
 Schoenoplectus senegalensis (Hochst. ex Steud.) Palla, indigenous
 Schoenoplectus tabernaemontani (C.C.Gmel.) Palla, not indigenous, naturalised
 Schoenoplectus triqueter (L.) Palla, not indigenous, naturalised

Schoenoxiphium
Genus Schoenoxiphium:
 Schoenoxiphium altum Kukkonen, accepted as Carex capensis Thunb. endemic
 Schoenoxiphium basutorum Turrill, accepted as Carex basutorum (Turrill) Luceno & Martin-Bravo, indigenous
 Schoenoxiphium bracteosum Kukkonen, accepted as Carex schimperiana Boeck. indigenous
 Schoenoxiphium buchananii C.B.Clarke ex C.B.Clarke, accepted as Carex kukkoneniana Luceno & Martin-Bravo, indigenous
 Schoenoxiphium burkei C.B.Clarke, accepted as Carex burkei (C.B.Clarke) Luceno & Martin-Bravo, indigenous
 Schoenoxiphium burttii Kukkonen, accepted as Carex pseudorufa Luceno & Martin-Bravo, endemic
 Schoenoxiphium capense Nees, accepted as Carex lancea (Thunb.) Baill. indigenous
 Schoenoxiphium caricoides C.B.Clarke, accepted as Carex spartea Wahlenb. indigenous
 Schoenoxiphium caricoides C.B.Clarke var. major (C.B.Clarke) C.B.Clarke, accepted as Carex spartea Wahlenb. indigenous
 Schoenoxiphium distinctum Kukkonen, accepted as Carex distincta (Kukkonen) Luceno & Martin-Bravo, indigenous
 Schoenoxiphium dregeanum Kunth, accepted as Carex ludwigii (Hochst.) Luceno & Martin-Bravo, indigenous
 Schoenoxiphium ecklonii Nees, accepted as Carex capensis Thunb. endemic
 Schoenoxiphium ecklonii Nees var. unisexuale Kuk. accepted as Carex capensis Thunb. endemic
 Schoenoxiphium filiforme Kuk. accepted as Carex killickii Nelmes, indigenous
 Schoenoxiphium kunthianum Kuk. accepted as Carex spartea Wahlenb. indigenous
 Schoenoxiphium lanceum (Thunb.) Kuk. accepted as Carex lancea (Thunb.) Baill. endemic
 Schoenoxiphium lehmannii (Nees) Kunth ex Steud. accepted as Carex uhligii K.Schum. ex C.B.Clarke, indigenous
 Schoenoxiphium ludwigii Hochst. accepted as Carex ludwigii (Hochst.) Luceno & Martin-Bravo, indigenous
 Schoenoxiphium madagascariense Cherm. accepted as Carex multispiculata Luceno & Martin-Bravo, indigenous
 Schoenoxiphium meyerianum Kunth, accepted as Carex lancea (Thunb.) Baill. indigenous
 Schoenoxiphium molle Kukkonen, accepted as Carex killickii Nelmes, endemic
 Schoenoxiphium perdensum Kukkonen, accepted as Carex perdensa (Kukkonen) Luceno & Martin-Bravo, endemic
 Schoenoxiphium rufum Nees, accepted as Carex ludwigii (Hochst.) Luceno & Martin-Bravo, endemic
 Schoenoxiphium rufum Nees var. dregeanum (Kunth) Kuk. accepted as Carex ludwigii (Hochst.) Luceno & Martin-Bravo, endemic
 Schoenoxiphium rufum Nees var. pondoense Kuk. accepted as Carex ludwigii (Hochst.) Luceno & Martin-Bravo, endemic
 Schoenoxiphium schimperianum (Boeck.) C.B.Clarke, accepted as Carex schimperiana Boeck. indigenous
 Schoenoxiphium schweickerdtii Merxm. & Podlech, accepted as Carex schweickerdtii (Merxm. & Podlech) Luceno & Martin-Bravo, endemic
 Schoenoxiphium sickmannianum Kunth, accepted as Carex lancea (Thunb.) Baill. indigenous
 Schoenoxiphium sparteum (Wahlenb.) C.B.Clarke, accepted as Carex spartea Wahlenb. indigenous
 Schoenoxiphium sparteum (Wahlenb.) C.B.Clarke var. lehmannii (Nees) Kuk. accepted as Carex uhligii K.Schum. ex C.B.Clarke, indigenous
 Schoenoxiphium sparteum (Wahlenb.) C.B.Clarke var. schimperianum (Boeck.) Kuk. accepted as Carex schimperiana Boeck. indigenous
 Schoenoxiphium strictum Kukkonen, accepted as Carex killickii Nelmes, endemic
 Schoenoxiphium thunbergii Nees, accepted as Carex capensis Thunb. endemic

Schoenus
Genus Schoenus:
 Schoenus glomeratus Thunb. accepted as Carpha glomerata (Thunb.) Nees 
 Schoenus lanceus Thunb. accepted as Carex lancea (Thunb.) Baill. indigenous
 Schoenus nigricans L. indigenous

Scirpoides
Genus Scirpoides:
 Scirpoides burkei (C.B.Clarke) Goetgh. Muasya & D.A.Simpson, indigenous
 Scirpoides dioeca (Kunth) Browning, accepted as Afroscirpoides dioeca (Kunth) Garcia-Madr. indigenous
 Scirpoides nodosus (Rottb.) Sojak, accepted as Ficinia nodosa (Rottb.) Goetgh. Muasya & D.A.Simpson, present
 Scirpoides thunbergii (Schrad.) Sojak, endemic
 Scirpoides varia Browning, indigenous

Scirpus
Genus Scirpus:
 Scirpus bulbiferus Boeck. accepted as Isolepis bulbifera (Boeck.) Muasya, present
 Scirpus burkei C.B.Clarke, accepted as Scirpoides burkei (C.B.Clarke) Goetgh. Muasya & D.A.Simpson, present
 Scirpus cubensis Poepp. & Kunth, accepted as Cyperus blepharoleptos Steud. present
 Scirpus diabolicus Steud. accepted as Isolepis diabolica (Steud.) Schrad. present
 Scirpus dioecus (Kunth) Boeck. accepted as Afroscirpoides dioeca (Kunth) Garcia-Madr. indigenous
 Scirpus dregeanus C.B.Clarke, accepted as Isolepis capensis Muasya, present
 Scirpus falsus C.B.Clarke, accepted as Dracoscirpoides falsa (C.B.Clarke) Muasya, indigenous
 Scirpus ficinioides Kunth, accepted as Dracoscirpoides ficinioides (Kunth) Muasya, indigenous
 Scirpus holoschoenus L. var. thunbergii (Schrad.) C.B.Clarke, accepted as Scirpoides thunbergii (Schrad.) Sojak, indigenous
 Scirpus maritimus L. accepted as Bolboschoenus maritimus (L.) Palla, not indigenous, naturalised, invasive
 Scirpus microcephalus (Steud.) Dandy, accepted as Cyperus kyllingiella Larridon, present
 Scirpus nodosus Rottb. accepted as Ficinia nodosa (Rottb.) Goetgh. Muasya & D.A.Simpson, present
 Scirpus pinguiculus C.B.Clarke, endemic
 Scirpus schinzii Boeck. accepted as Afroscirpoides dioeca (Kunth) Garcia-Madr. 
 Scirpus thunbergianus Nees ex Levyns, accepted as Scirpoides thunbergii (Schrad.) Sojak, indigenous
 Scirpus thunbergii (Schrad.) A.Spreng. accepted as Scirpoides thunbergii (Schrad.) Sojak, indigenous
 Scirpus varius Boeck. ex C.B.Clarke, accepted as Scirpoides varia Browning, indigenous

Scleria
Genus Scleria:
 Scleria achtenii De Wild. indigenous
 Scleria angusta Nees ex Kunth, indigenous
 Scleria aterrima (Ridl.) Napper, accepted as Scleria catophylla C.B.Clarke, indigenous
 Scleria bulbifera Hochst. ex A.Rich. indigenous
 Scleria catophylla C.B.Clarke, indigenous
 Scleria dieterlenii Turrill, indigenous
 Scleria distans Poir. indigenous
 Scleria distans Poir. var. distans, indigenous
 Scleria dregeana Kunth, indigenous
 Scleria foliosa Hochst. ex A.Rich. indigenous
 Scleria greigiifolia (Ridl.) C.B.Clarke, indigenous
 Scleria melanomphala Kunth, indigenous
 Scleria natalensis Boeck. ex C.B.Clarke, endemic
 Scleria nutans Willd. ex Kunth, accepted as Scleria distans Poir. present
 Scleria pergracilis (Nees) Kunth, indigenous
 Scleria poiformis Retz. indigenous
 Scleria rehmannii C.B.Clarke, indigenous
 Scleria sobolifer E.F.Franklin, endemic
 Scleria transvaalensis E.F.Franklin, indigenous
 Scleria unguiculata E.A.Rob. indigenous
 Scleria welwitschii C.B.Clarke, indigenous
 Scleria woodii C.B.Clarke, indigenous

Tetraria
Genus Tetraria:
 Tetraria autumnalis Levyns, accepted as Tetraria ligulata (Boeck.) C.B.Clarke, present
 Tetraria bachmannii Kuk. accepted as Cyathocoma bachmannii (Kuk.) C.Archer, present
 Tetraria bolusii C.B.Clarke, endemic
 Tetraria brachyphylla Levyns, endemic
 Tetraria brevicaulis C.B.Clarke, accepted as Capeobolus brevicaulis (C.B.Clarke) Browning, present
 Tetraria bromoides (Lam.) H.Pfeiff. endemic
 Tetraria burmannii (Vahl) C.B.Clarke, endemic
 Tetraria capillacea (Thunb.) C.B.Clarke, endemic
 Tetraria compacta Levyns, endemic
 Tetraria compar (L.) P.Beauv. endemic
 Tetraria crassa Levyns, endemic
 Tetraria crinifolia (Nees) C.B.Clarke, endemic
 Tetraria cuspidata (Rottb.) C.B.Clarke, indigenous
 Tetraria cuspidata (Rottb.) C.B.Clarke var. cuspidata, indigenous
 Tetraria cuspidata (Rottb.) C.B.Clarke var. lorea (Nees) C.B.Clarke, endemic
 Tetraria exilis Levyns, endemic
 Tetraria eximia C.B.Clarke, endemic
 Tetraria fasciata (Rottb.) C.B.Clarke, endemic
 Tetraria ferruginea C.B.Clarke, endemic
 Tetraria fimbriolata (Nees) C.B.Clarke, endemic
 Tetraria flexuosa (Thunb.) C.B.Clarke, endemic
 Tetraria fourcadei Turrill & Schonland, endemic
 Tetraria galpinii Schonland & Turrill, endemic
 Tetraria graminifolia Levyns, endemic
 Tetraria involucrata (Rottb.) C.B.Clarke, endemic
 Tetraria ligulata (Boeck.) C.B.Clarke, endemic
 Tetraria maculata Schonland & Turrill, endemic
 Tetraria microstachys (Vahl) H.Pfeiff. endemic
 Tetraria nigrovaginata (Nees) C.B.Clarke, endemic
 Tetraria paludosa Levyns, endemic
 Tetraria picta (Boeck.) C.B.Clarke, endemic
 Tetraria pillansii Levyns, endemic
 Tetraria pubescens Schonland & Turrill, endemic
 Tetraria pygmaea Levyns, endemic
 Tetraria robusta (Kunth) C.B.Clarke, endemic
 Tetraria schonlandii Turrill, endemic
 Tetraria secans C.B.Clarke, endemic
 Tetraria sylvatica (Nees) C.B.Clarke, indigenous
 Tetraria sylvatica (Nees) C.B.Clarke var. pseudolorea Kuk. endemic
 Tetraria sylvatica (Nees) C.B.Clarke var. sylvatica, endemic
 Tetraria sylvatica (Nees) C.B.Clarke var. triflora Kuk. endemic
 Tetraria thermalis (L.) C.B.Clarke, endemic
 Tetraria triangularis (Boeck.) C.B.Clarke, endemic
 Tetraria ustulata (L.) C.B.Clarke, endemic
 Tetraria vaginata Schonland & Turrill, endemic
 Tetraria variabilis Levyns, endemic

Trianoptiles
Genus Trianoptiles:
 Trianoptiles capensis (Steud.) Harv. endemic
 Trianoptiles solitaria (C.B.Clarke) Levyns, endemic
 Trianoptiles stipitata Levyns, endemic

Uncinia
Genus Uncinia:
 Uncinia lehmannii Nees, accepted as Carex uhligii K.Schum. ex C.B.Clarke, indigenous
 Uncinia spartea (Wahlenb.) Spreng. accepted as Carex spartea Wahlenb. indigenous
 Uncinia sprengelii Nees, accepted as Carex spartea Wahlenb. indigenous

Websteria
Genus Websteria:
 Websteria confervoides (Poir.) S.S.Hooper, accepted as Eleocharis confervoides (Poir.) Steud.

Eriocaulaceae
Family: Eriocaulaceae,

Eriocaulon
Genus Eriocaulon:
 Eriocaulon abyssinicum Hochst. indigenous
 Eriocaulon africanum Hochst. indigenous
 Eriocaulon angustisepalum H.E.Hess, accepted as Eriocaulon mutatum N.E.Br. var. angustisepalum (H.E.Hess) S.M.Phillips, present
 Eriocaulon dregei Hochst. endemic
 Eriocaulon dregei Hochst. var. sonderianum (Korn.) Oberm. accepted as Eriocaulon sonderianum Korn. present
 Eriocaulon gilgianum Ruhland, accepted as Eriocaulon abyssinicum Hochst. present
 Eriocaulon hydrophilum Markotter, indigenous
 Eriocaulon maculatum Schinz, indigenous
 Eriocaulon mutatum N.E.Br. indigenous
 Eriocaulon mutatum N.E.Br. var. angustisepalum (H.E.Hess) S.M.Phillips, indigenous
 Eriocaulon ruhlandii Schinz, accepted as Eriocaulon schlechteri Ruhland, present
 Eriocaulon schlechteri Ruhland, indigenous
 Eriocaulon sonderianum Korn. indigenous
 Eriocaulon transvaalicum N.E.Br. indigenous
 Eriocaulon transvaalicum N.E.Br. subsp. tofieldifolium (Schinz) S.M.Phillips, indigenous
 Eriocaulon transvaalicum N.E.Br. subsp. transvaalicum, indigenous

Syngonanthus
Genus Syngonanthus:
 Syngonanthus wahlbergii (Wikstr. ex Korn.) Ruhland, indigenous
 Syngonanthus wahlbergii (Wikstr. ex Korn.) Ruhland var. wahlbergii, indigenous

Flagellariaceae
Family: Flagellariaceae,

Flagellaria
Genus Flagellaria:
 Flagellaria guineensis Schumach. indigenous

Juncaceae
Family: Juncaceae,

Juncus
Genus Juncus:
 Juncus acutus L. indigenous
 Juncus acutus L. subsp. leopoldii (Parl.) Snogerup, indigenous
 Juncus bufonius L. not indigenous, naturalised
 Juncus capensis Thunb. endemic
 Juncus capillaceus Lam. not indigenous, naturalised, invasive
 Juncus capitatus Weigel, not indigenous, naturalised
 Juncus cephalotes Thunb. endemic
 Juncus dregeanus Kunth, indigenous
 Juncus dregeanus Kunth subsp. dregeanus, indigenous
 Juncus effusus L. indigenous
 Juncus exsertus Buchenau, indigenous
 Juncus exsertus Buchenau subsp. exsertus, accepted as Juncus exsertus Buchenau, indigenous
 Juncus exsertus Buchenau subsp. lesuticus B.L.Burtt, accepted as Juncus exsertus Buchenau, indigenous
 Juncus imbricatus Laharpe, not indigenous, naturalised, invasive
 Juncus inaequalis Buchenau var. squarrosus Adamson, accepted as Juncus cephalotes Thunb. present
 Juncus inflexus L. indigenous
 Juncus kraussii Hochst. indigenous
 Juncus kraussii Hochst. subsp. kraussii, indigenous
 Juncus lomatophyllus Spreng. indigenous
 Juncus mollifolius Hilliard & B.L.Burtt, accepted as Juncus dregeanus Kunth subsp. dregeanus, indigenous
 Juncus obliquus Adamson, indigenous
 Juncus oxycarpus E.Mey. ex Kunth, indigenous
 Juncus pictus Steud. endemic
 Juncus punctorius L.f. indigenous
 Juncus rigidus Desf. indigenous
 Juncus rupestris Kunth, indigenous
 Juncus scabriusculus Kunth, endemic
 Juncus sonderianus Buchenau, accepted as Juncus dregeanus Kunth subsp. dregeanus, present
 Juncus stenopetalus Adamson, endemic
 Juncus tenuis Willd. not indigenous, naturalised

Luzula
Genus Luzula:
 Luzula africana Drege ex Steud. indigenous

Poaceae

Family: Poaceae, 206 genera have been recorded. Not all are necessarily currently accepted.
 
 Genus Achnatherum:
 Genus Acrachne:
 Genus Acroceras:
 Genus Agrostis:
 Genus Aira:
 Genus Alloteropsis:
 Genus Alopecurus:
 Genus Amelichloa:
 Genus Ammophila:
 Genus Andropogon:
 Genus Anthephora:
 Genus Anthoxanthum:
 Genus Aristida:
 Genus Arrhenatherum:
 Genus Arthratherum:
 Genus Arthraxon:
 Genus Arundinella:
 Genus Arundo:
 Genus Avena:
 Genus Axonopus:
 Genus Bambusa:
 Genus Bewsia:
 Genus Bothriochloa:
 Genus Brachiaria:
 Genus Brachychloa:
 Genus Brachypodium:
 Genus Briza:
 Genus Brizopyrum:
 Genus Bromus:
 Genus Calamagrostis:
 Genus Capeochloa:
 Genus Catalepis:
 Genus Catapodium:
 Genus Cenchrus:
 Genus Centropodia:
 Genus Chaetobromus:
 Genus Chloris:
 Genus Chrysopogon:
 Genus Cladoraphis:
 Genus Cleistachne:
 Genus Coelachyrum:
 Genus Coelorachis:
 Genus Coix:
 Genus Colpodium:
 Genus Cortaderia:
 Genus Corynephorus:
 Genus Craspedorhachis:
 Genus Ctenium:
 Genus Cymbopogon:
 Genus Cynodon:
 Genus Cynosurus:
 Genus Dactylis:
 Genus Dactyloctenium:
 Genus Danthonia:
 Genus Danthoniopsis:
 Genus Deschampsia:
 Genus Desmazeria:
 Genus Diandrochloa:
 Genus Dichanthium:
 Genus Digitaria:
 Genus Diheteropogon:
 Genus Dinebra:
 Genus Diplachne:
 Genus Dregeochloa:
 Genus Echinochloa:
 Genus Ehrharta:
 Genus Eleusine:
 Genus Elionurus:
 Genus Elymandra:
 Genus Elymus:
 Genus Elytrigia:
 Genus Elytrophorus:
 Genus Enneapogon:
 Genus Enteropogon:
 Genus Entolasia:
 Genus Eragrostis:
 Genus Eriachne:
 Genus Eriochloa:
 Genus Eriochrysis:
 Genus Eulalia:
 Genus Eustachys:
 Genus Festuca:
 Genus Fingerhuthia:
 Genus Gastridium:
 Genus Geochloa:
 Genus Glyceria:
 Genus Gymnothrix:
 Genus Hackelochloa:
 Genus Hainardia:
 Genus Harpochloa:
 Genus Helictotrichon:
 Genus Hemarthria:
 Genus Heteropogon:
 Genus Holcus:
 Genus Hordeum:
 Genus Hyparrhenia:
 Genus Hyperthelia:
 Genus Imperata:
 Genus Ischaemum:
 Genus Karroochloa:
 Genus Koeleria:
 Genus Lagurus:
 Genus Lamarckia:
 Genus Lasiagrostis:
 Genus Lasiochloa:
 Genus Leersia:
 Genus Leptocarydion:
 Genus Leptochloa:
 Genus Lepturus:
 Genus Leucophrys:
 Genus Lintonia:
 Genus Lolium:
 Genus Lophacme:
 Genus Lophochloa:
 Genus Loudetia:
 Genus Maltebrunia:
 Genus Megaloprotachne:
 Genus Megastachya:
 Genus Melica:
 Genus Melinis:
 Genus Merxmuellera:
 Genus Microchloa:
 Genus Microlaena:
 Genus Microstegium:
 Genus Miscanthus:
 Genus Monocymbium:
 Genus Mosdenia:
 Genus Nassella:
 Genus Nastus:
 Genus Odontelytrum:
 Genus Odyssea:
 Genus Olyra:
 Genus Oplismenus:
 Genus Oropetium:
 Genus Oryza:
 Genus Oxyrhachis:
 Genus Oxytenanthera:
 Genus Panicum:
 Genus Parapholis:
 Genus Paspalidium:
 Genus Paspalum:
 Genus Pennisetum:
 Genus Pentameris:
 Genus Pentaschistis:
 Genus Periballia:
 Genus Perotis:
 Genus Petrina:
 Genus Phacelurus:
 Genus Phalaris:
 Genus Phragmites:
 Genus Poa:
 Genus Pogonarthria:
 Genus Polevansia:
 Genus Polypogon:
 Genus Prionanthium:
 Genus Prosphytochloa:
 Genus Pseudechinolaena:
 Genus Puccinellia:
 Genus Rendlia:
 Genus Rhytachne:
 Genus Rottboellia:
 Genus Sacciolepis:
 Genus Sartidia:
 Genus Sasa:
 Genus Schismus:
 Genus Schizachyrium:
 Genus Schmidtia:
 Genus Schoenefeldia:
 Genus Sclerochloa:
 Genus Secale:
 Genus Sehima:
 Genus Setaria:
 Genus Sorghastrum:
 Genus Sorghum:
 Genus Spartina:
 Genus Sphenopus:
 Genus Sporobolus:
 Genus Steinchisma:
 Genus Stenotaphrum:
 Genus Stereochlaena:
 Genus Stiburus:
 Genus Stipa:
 Genus Stipagrostis:
 Genus Streblochaete:
 Genus Styppeiochloa:
 Genus Tarigidia:
 Genus Tenaxia:
 Genus Tetrachne:
 Genus Tetrapogon:
 Genus Thamnocalamus:
 Genus Themeda:
 Genus Thinopyrum:
 Genus Trachypogon:
 Genus Tragus:
 Genus Tribolium:
 Genus Tricholaena:
 Genus Trichoneura:
 Genus Trichopteryx:
 Genus Tripogon:
 Genus Triraphis:
 Genus Tristachya:
 Genus Urelytrum:
 Genus Urochlaena:
 Genus Urochloa:
 Genus Vetiveria:
 Genus Vulpia:

Restionaceae
Family: Restionaceae,

Anthochortus
Genus Anthochortus:
 Anthochortus capensis Esterh. endemic
 Anthochortus crinalis (Mast.) H.P.Linder, endemic
 Anthochortus ecklonii Nees, endemic
 Anthochortus graminifolius (Kunth) H.P.Linder, endemic
 Anthochortus insignis (Mast.) H.P.Linder, endemic
 Anthochortus laxiflorus (Nees) H.P.Linder, endemic
 Anthochortus singularis Esterh. endemic

Askidiosperma
Genus Askidiosperma:
 Askidiosperma albo-aristatum (Pillans) H.P.Linder, endemic
 Askidiosperma alticolum (Esterh.) H.P.Linder, endemic
 Askidiosperma andreaeanum (Pillans) H.P.Linder, endemic
 Askidiosperma capitatum Steud. endemic
 Askidiosperma chartaceum (Pillans) H.P.Linder, endemic
 Askidiosperma chartaceum (Pillans) H.P.Linder subsp. alticolum Esterh. accepted as Askidiosperma alticolum (Esterh.) H.P.Linder, present
 Askidiosperma delicatulum H.P.Linder, endemic
 Askidiosperma esterhuyseniae (Pillans) H.P.Linder, endemic
 Askidiosperma insigne (Pillans) H.P.Linder, endemic
 Askidiosperma longiflorum (Pillans) H.P.Linder, endemic
 Askidiosperma nitidum (Mast.) H.P.Linder, endemic
 Askidiosperma paniculatum (Mast.) H.P.Linder, endemic
 Askidiosperma rugosum Esterh. endemic

Calopsis
Genus Calopsis:
 Calopsis adpressa Esterh. accepted as Restio adpressus (Esterh.) H.P.Linder & C.R.Hardy, endemic
 Calopsis andreaeana (Pillans) H.P.Linder, accepted as Restio andreaeanus (Pillans) H.P.Linder & C.R.Hardy, endemic
 Calopsis aspera (Mast.) H.P.Linder, accepted as Restio asperus (Mast.) H.P.Linder & C.R.Hardy, endemic
 Calopsis burchellii (Mast.) H.P.Linder, accepted as Restio albotuberculatus H.P.Linder & C.R.Hardy, endemic
 Calopsis clandestina Esterh. accepted as Restio clandestinus (Esterh.) H.P.Linder & C.R.Hardy, endemic
 Calopsis dura Esterh. accepted as Restio durus (Esterh.) H.P.Linder & C.R.Hardy, endemic
 Calopsis esterhuyseniae (Pillans) H.P.Linder, accepted as Restio distylis H.P.Linder & C.R.Hardy, endemic
 Calopsis filiformis (Mast.) H.P.Linder, accepted as Restio tenuispicatus H.P.Linder & C.R.Hardy, endemic
 Calopsis fruticosa (Mast.) H.P.Linder, accepted as Restio calcicola H.P.Linder & C.R.Hardy, endemic
 Calopsis gracilis (Mast.) H.P.Linder, accepted as Restio ramosissimus H.P.Linder & C.R.Hardy, endemic
 Calopsis hyalina (Mast.) H.P.Linder, accepted as Restio hyalinus (Mast.) H.P.Linder & C.R.Hardy, endemic
 Calopsis impolita (Kunth) H.P.Linder, accepted as Restio impolitus Kunth, endemic
 Calopsis levynsiae (Pillans) H.P.Linder, accepted as Restio levynsiae (Pillans) H.P.Linder & C.R.Hardy, endemic
 Calopsis marlothii (Pillans) H.P.Linder, accepted as Restio rudolfii (Pillans) H.P.Linder & C.R.Hardy, endemic
 Calopsis membranacea (Pillans) H.P.Linder, accepted as Restio parvispiculus H.P.Linder & C.R.Hardy, endemic
 Calopsis monostylis (Pillans) H.P.Linder, accepted as Restio monostylis (Pillans) H.P.Linder & C.R.Hardy, endemic
 Calopsis muirii (Pillans) H.P.Linder, accepted as Restio muirii (Pillans) H.P.Linder & C.R.Hardy, endemic
 Calopsis nudiflora (Pillans) H.P.Linder, accepted as Restio nudiflorus (Pillans) H.P.Linder & C.R.Hardy, endemic
 Calopsis paniculata (Rottb.) Desv. accepted as Restio paniculatus Rottb. endemic
 Calopsis pulchra Esterh. accepted as Restio pulcher (Esterh.) H.P.Linder & C.R.Hardy, endemic
 Calopsis rigida (Mast.) H.P.Linder, accepted as Restio rigidus (Mast.) H.P.Linder & C.R.Hardy, endemic
 Calopsis rigorata (Mast.) H.P.Linder, accepted as Restio rigoratus (Mast.) H.P.Linder & C.R.Hardy, endemic
 Calopsis sparsa Esterh. accepted as Restio villosus H.P.Linder & C.R.Hardy, endemic
 Calopsis viminea (Rottb.) H.P.Linder, accepted as Restio vimineus Rottb. endemic

Cannomois
Genus Cannomois:
 Cannomois anfracta H.P.Linder, endemic
 Cannomois arenicola H.P.Linder, endemic
 Cannomois aristata Mast. endemic
 Cannomois congesta Mast. endemic
 Cannomois grandis H.P.Linder, endemic
 Cannomois nitida (Mast.) Pillans, endemic
 Cannomois parviflora (Thunb.) Pillans, endemic
 Cannomois primosii (Pillans) H.P.Linder, endemic
 Cannomois robusta (Kunth) H.P.Linder, endemic
 Cannomois saundersii Mujaju, accepted as Cannomois robusta (Kunth) H.P.Linder, endemic
 Cannomois schlechteri Mast. endemic
 Cannomois scirpoides (Kunth) Mast. endemic
 Cannomois spicata Mast. endemic
 Cannomois taylorii H.P.Linder, accepted as Cannomois schlechteri Mast. present
 Cannomois virgata (Rottb.) Steud. endemic

Ceratocaryum
Genus Ceratocaryum:
 Ceratocaryum argenteum Kunth, endemic
 Ceratocaryum caespitosum H.P.Linder, endemic
 Ceratocaryum decipiens (N.E.Br.) H.P.Linder, endemic
 Ceratocaryum fimbriatum (Kunth) H.P.Linder, endemic
 Ceratocaryum fistulosum Mast. endemic
 Ceratocaryum persistens H.P.Linder, endemic
 Ceratocaryum pulchrum H.P.Linder, endemic
 Ceratocaryum xerophilum (Pillans) H.P.Linder, endemic

Chondropetalum
Genus Chondropetalum:
 Chondropetalum acockii Pillans, accepted as Elegia acockii (Pillans) Moline & H.P.Linder, endemic
 Chondropetalum aggregatum (Mast.) Pillans, accepted as Elegia aggregata (Mast.) Moline & H.P.Linder, endemic
 Chondropetalum decipiens Esterh. accepted as Elegia decipiens (Esterh.) Moline & H.P.Linder, endemic
 Chondropetalum deustum Rottb. accepted as Elegia deusta (Rottb.) Kunth, endemic
 Chondropetalum ebracteatum (Kunth) Pillans, accepted as Elegia ebracteata (Kunth) Moline & H.P.Linder, endemic
 Chondropetalum hookerianum (Mast.) Pillans, accepted as Elegia hookeriana (Mast.) Moline & H.P.Linder, endemic
 Chondropetalum marlothii (Pillans) Pillans, accepted as Elegia marlothii (Pillans) Moline & H.P.Linder, endemic
 Chondropetalum microcarpum (Kunth) Pillans, accepted as Elegia microcarpa (Kunth) Moline & H.P.Linder, endemic
 Chondropetalum mucronatum (Nees) Pillans, accepted as Elegia mucronata (Nees) Kunth, endemic
 Chondropetalum nudum Rottb. accepted as Elegia nuda (Rottb.) Kunth, endemic
 Chondropetalum rectum (Mast.) Pillans, accepted as Elegia recta (Mast.) Moline & H.P.Linder, endemic
 Chondropetalum tectorum (L.f.) Raf. accepted as Elegia tectorum (L.f.) Moline & H.P.Linder, endemic

Dovea
Genus Dovea:
 Dovea macrocarpa Kunth, accepted as Elegia macrocarpa (Kunth) Moline & H.P.Linder, endemic

Elegia
Genus Elegia:
 Elegia acockii (Pillans) Moline & H.P.Linder, endemic
 Elegia aggregata (Mast.) Moline & H.P.Linder, endemic
 Elegia altigena Pillans, endemic
 Elegia amoena Pillans, endemic
 Elegia asperiflora (Nees) Kunth, endemic
 Elegia atratiflora Esterh. endemic
 Elegia caespitosa Esterh. endemic
 Elegia capensis (Burm.f.) Schelpe, endemic
 Elegia coleura Mast. endemic
 Elegia cuspidata Mast. endemic
 Elegia decipiens (Esterh.) Moline & H.P.Linder, endemic
 Elegia deusta (Rottb.) Kunth, endemic
 Elegia dregeana Kunth, accepted as Elegia asperiflora (Nees) Kunth, present
 Elegia ebracteata (Kunth) Moline & H.P.Linder, endemic
 Elegia elephantina H.P.Linder, endemic
 Elegia equisetacea Mast. endemic
 Elegia esterhuyseniae Pillans, endemic
 Elegia extensa Pillans, endemic
 Elegia fastigiata Mast. endemic
 Elegia fenestrata Pillans, endemic
 Elegia filacea Mast. endemic
 Elegia fistulosa Kunth, endemic
 Elegia fucata Esterh. endemic
 Elegia galpinii N.E.Br. endemic
 Elegia grandis (Nees) Kunth, endemic
 Elegia grandispicata H.P.Linder, endemic
 Elegia hookeriana (Mast.) Moline & H.P.Linder, endemic
 Elegia hutchinsonii Pillans, endemic
 Elegia intermedia (Steud.) Pillans, endemic
 Elegia juncea L. endemic
 Elegia macrocarpa (Kunth) Moline & H.P.Linder, endemic
 Elegia marlothii (Pillans) Moline & H.P.Linder, endemic
 Elegia microcarpa (Kunth) Moline & H.P.Linder, endemic
 Elegia mucronata (Nees) Kunth, endemic
 Elegia muirii Pillans, endemic
 Elegia namaquense H.P.Linder & Helme, endemic
 Elegia neesii Mast. endemic
 Elegia nuda (Rottb.) Kunth, endemic
 Elegia persistens Mast. endemic
 Elegia prominens Pillans, endemic
 Elegia racemosa (Poir.) Pers. endemic
 Elegia recta (Mast.) Moline & H.P.Linder, endemic
 Elegia rigida Mast. endemic
 Elegia spathacea Mast. endemic
 Elegia squamosa Mast. endemic
 Elegia stipularis Mast. endemic
 Elegia stokoei Pillans, endemic
 Elegia tectorum (L.f.) Moline & H.P.Linder, endemic
 Elegia thyrsifera (Rottb.) Pers. endemic
 Elegia thyrsoidea (Mast.) Pillans, endemic
 Elegia vaginulata Mast. endemic
 Elegia verreauxii Mast. endemic

Hydrophilus
Genus Hydrophilus:
 Hydrophilus rattrayi (Pillans) H.P.Linder, endemic

Hypodiscus
Genus Hypodiscus:
 Hypodiscus albo-aristatus (Nees) Mast. endemic
 Hypodiscus alternans Pillans, endemic
 Hypodiscus argenteus (Thunb.) Mast. endemic
 Hypodiscus aristatus (Thunb.) C.Krauss, endemic
 Hypodiscus laevigatus (Kunth) H.P.Linder, endemic
 Hypodiscus montanus Esterh. endemic
 Hypodiscus neesii Mast. endemic
 Hypodiscus procurrens Esterh. endemic
 Hypodiscus rigidus Mast. endemic
 Hypodiscus rugosus Mast. endemic
 Hypodiscus squamosus Esterh. endemic
 Hypodiscus striatus (Kunth) Mast. endemic
 Hypodiscus sulcatus Pillans, endemic
 Hypodiscus synchroolepis (Steud.) Mast. endemic
 Hypodiscus willdenowia (Nees) Mast. endemic

Ischyrolepis
Genus Ischyrolepis:
 Ischyrolepis affinis Esterh. accepted as Restio affinis (Esterh.) H.P.Linder & C.R.Hardy, endemic
 Ischyrolepis arida (Pillans) H.P.Linder, accepted as Restio aridus Pillans, endemic
 Ischyrolepis caespitosa Esterh. accepted as Restio caespitosus (Esterh.) H.P.Linder & C.R.Hardy, endemic
 Ischyrolepis capensis (L.) H.P.Linder, accepted as Restio capensis (L.) H.P.Linder & C.R.Hardy, endemic
 Ischyrolepis cincinnata (Mast.) H.P.Linder, accepted as Restio cincinnatus Mast. endemic
 Ischyrolepis coactilis (Mast.) H.P.Linder, accepted as Restio coactilis Mast. endemic
 Ischyrolepis curvibracteata Esterh. accepted as Restio curvibracteatus (Esterh.) H.P.Linder & C.R.Hardy, endemic
 Ischyrolepis curviramis (Kunth) H.P.Linder, accepted as Restio curviramis Kunth, endemic
 Ischyrolepis distracta (Mast.) H.P.Linder, accepted as Restio distractus Mast. endemic
 Ischyrolepis duthieae (Pillans) H.P.Linder, accepted as Restio duthieae Pillans, endemic
 Ischyrolepis eleocharis (Mast.) H.P.Linder, accepted as Restio eleocharis Mast. endemic
 Ischyrolepis esterhuyseniae (Pillans) H.P.Linder, accepted as Restio esterhuyseniae Pillans, endemic
 Ischyrolepis feminea Esterh. accepted as Restio femineus (Esterh.) H.P.Linder & C.R.Hardy, endemic
 Ischyrolepis fraterna (Kunth) H.P.Linder, accepted as Restio fraternus Kunth, endemic
 Ischyrolepis fuscidula (Pillans) H.P.Linder, accepted as Restio fuscidulus Pillans, endemic
 Ischyrolepis gaudichaudiana (Kunth) H.P.Linder, accepted as Restio gaudichaudianus Kunth, endemic
 Ischyrolepis gaudichaudiana (Kunth) H.P.Linder var. luxurians Pillans, accepted as Restio luxurians (Pillans) H.P.Linder, endemic
 Ischyrolepis gossypina (Mast.) H.P.Linder, accepted as Restio gossypinus Mast. endemic
 Ischyrolepis helenae (Mast.) H.P.Linder, accepted as Restio helenae Mast. endemic
 Ischyrolepis hystrix (Mast.) H.P.Linder, accepted as Restio hystrix Mast. endemic
 Ischyrolepis karooica Esterh. accepted as Restio karooicus (Esterh.) H.P.Linder & C.R.Hardy, endemic
 Ischyrolepis laniger (Kunth) H.P.Linder, accepted as Restio laniger Kunth, endemic
 Ischyrolepis leptoclados (Mast.) H.P.Linder, accepted as Restio leptoclados Mast. endemic
 Ischyrolepis longiaristata H.P.Linder, accepted as Restio longiaristatus (Pillans ex H.P.Linder) H.P.Linder & C.R.Hardy, endemic
 Ischyrolepis macer (Kunth) H.P.Linder, accepted as Restio macer Kunth, endemic
 Ischyrolepis marlothii (Pillans) H.P.Linder, accepted as Restio marlothii Pillans, endemic
 Ischyrolepis monanthos (Mast.) H.P.Linder, accepted as Restio monanthos Mast. endemic
 Ischyrolepis nana Esterh. accepted as Restio nanus (Esterh.) H.P.Linder & C.R.Hardy, endemic
 Ischyrolepis nubigena Esterh. accepted as Restio nubigenus (Esterh.) H.P.Linder & C.R.Hardy, endemic
 Ischyrolepis ocreata (Kunth) H.P.Linder, accepted as Restio ocreatus Kunth, endemic
 Ischyrolepis paludosa (Pillans) H.P.Linder, accepted as Restio paludosus Pillans, endemic
 Ischyrolepis papillosa Esterh. accepted as Restio papillosus (Esterh.) H.P.Linder & C.R.Hardy, endemic
 Ischyrolepis pratensis Esterh. accepted as Restio pratensis (Esterh.) H.P.Linder & C.R.Hardy, endemic
 Ischyrolepis pygmaea (Pillans) H.P.Linder, accepted as Restio pygmaeus Pillans, endemic
 Ischyrolepis rivula Esterh. accepted as Restio rivulus (Esterh.) H.P.Linder & C.R.Hardy, endemic
 Ischyrolepis rottboellioides (Kunth) H.P.Linder, accepted as Restio rottboellioides Kunth, endemic
 Ischyrolepis sabulosa (Pillans) H.P.Linder, accepted as Restio sabulosus Pillans, endemic
 Ischyrolepis saxatilis Esterh. accepted as Restio saxatilis (Esterh.) H.P.Linder & C.R.Hardy, endemic
 Ischyrolepis schoenoides (Kunth) H.P.Linder, accepted as Restio schoenoides Kunth, indigenous
 Ischyrolepis setiger (Kunth) H.P.Linder, accepted as Restio setiger Kunth, endemic
 Ischyrolepis sieberi (Kunth) H.P.Linder, accepted as Restio sieberi Kunth, endemic
 Ischyrolepis sporadica Esterh. accepted as Restio sporadicus (Esterh.) H.P.Linder & C.R.Hardy, endemic
 Ischyrolepis subverticillata Steud. accepted as Restio subverticillatus (Steud.) Mast. endemic
 Ischyrolepis tenuissima (Kunth) H.P.Linder, accepted as Restio tenuissimus Kunth, endemic
 Ischyrolepis triflora (Rottb.) H.P.Linder, accepted as Restio triflora Rottb. endemic
 Ischyrolepis unispicata H.P.Linder, accepted as Restio unispicatus (H.P.Linder) H.P.Linder & C.R.Hardy, endemic
 Ischyrolepis venustulus (Kunth) H.P.Linder, accepted as Restio venustulus Kunth, endemic
 Ischyrolepis vilis (Kunth) H.P.Linder, accepted as Restio vilis Kunth, endemic
 Ischyrolepis virgea (Mast.) H.P.Linder, accepted as Restio venustulus Kunth, endemic
 Ischyrolepis wallichii (Mast.) H.P.Linder, accepted as Restio wallichii Mast. endemic
 Ischyrolepis wittebergensis Esterh. accepted as Restio wittebergensis (Esterh.) H.P.Linder & C.R.Hardy, endemic

Mastersiella
Genus Mastersiella:
 Mastersiella digitata (Thunb.) Gilg-Ben. endemic
 Mastersiella purpurea (Pillans) H.P.Linder, endemic
 Mastersiella spathulata (Pillans) H.P.Linder, endemic

Nevillea
Genus Nevillea:
 Nevillea obtusissima (Steud.) H.P.Linder, endemic
 Nevillea singularis Esterh. endemic
 Nevillea vlokii H.P.Linder, endemic

Platycaulos
Genus Platycaulos:
 Platycaulos acutus Esterh. endemic
 Platycaulos anceps (Mast.) H.P.Linder, endemic
 Platycaulos callistachyus (Kunth) H.P.Linder, endemic
 Platycaulos cascadensis (Pillans) H.P.Linder, endemic
 Platycaulos compressus (Rottb.) H.P.Linder, endemic
 Platycaulos depauperatus (Kunth) H.P.Linder, endemic
 Platycaulos galpinii (Pillans) H.P.Linder & C.R.Hardy, endemic
 Platycaulos major (Mast.) H.P.Linder, endemic
 Platycaulos subcompressus (Pillans) H.P.Linder, endemic

Restio
Genus Restio:
 Restio acockii Pillans, endemic
 Restio adpressus (Esterh.) H.P.Linder & C.R.Hardy, endemic
 Restio affinis (Esterh.) H.P.Linder & C.R.Hardy, endemic
 Restio albotuberculatus H.P.Linder & C.R.Hardy, endemic
 Restio alticola Pillans, endemic
 Restio ambiguus Mast. accepted as Soroveta ambigua (Mast.) H.P.Linder & C.R.Hardy, endemic
 Restio andreaeanus (Pillans) H.P.Linder & C.R.Hardy, endemic
 Restio anomalus H.P.Linder, endemic
 Restio arcuatus Mast. endemic
 Restio aridus Pillans, endemic
 Restio asperus (Mast.) H.P.Linder & C.R.Hardy, endemic
 Restio aureolus Pillans, endemic
 Restio bifarius Mast. endemic
 Restio bifidus Thunb. endemic
 Restio bifurcus Nees ex Mast. endemic
 Restio bolusii Pillans, endemic
 Restio brachiatus (Mast.) Pillans, endemic
 Restio brunneus Pillans, endemic
 Restio burchellii Pillans, endemic
 Restio caespitosus (Esterh.) H.P.Linder & C.R.Hardy, endemic
 Restio calcicola H.P.Linder & C.R.Hardy, endemic
 Restio capensis (L.) H.P.Linder & C.R.Hardy, endemic
 Restio capillaris Kunth, endemic
 Restio cedarbergensis H.P.Linder, endemic
 Restio cincinnatus Mast. endemic
 Restio clandestinus (Esterh.) H.P.Linder & C.R.Hardy, endemic
 Restio coactilis Mast. endemic
 Restio colliculospermus H.P.Linder, endemic
 Restio communis Pillans, endemic
 Restio confusus Pillans, endemic
 Restio constipatus H.P.Linder, endemic
 Restio corneolus Esterh. endemic
 Restio curvibracteatus (Esterh.) H.P.Linder & C.R.Hardy, endemic
 Restio curviramis Kunth, endemic
 Restio cymosus (Mast.) Pillans, endemic
 Restio debilis Nees, endemic
 Restio decipiens (N.E.Br.) H.P.Linder, endemic
 Restio degenerans Pillans, endemic
 Restio dispar Mast. endemic
 Restio distans Pillans, endemic
 Restio distichus Rottb. endemic
 Restio distractus Mast. endemic
 Restio distylis H.P.Linder & C.R.Hardy, endemic
 Restio dodii Pillans [9], indigenous
 Restio dodii Pillans var. dodii, endemic
 Restio dodii Pillans var. purpureus Pillans, endemic
 Restio durus (Esterh.) H.P.Linder & C.R.Hardy, endemic
 Restio duthieae Pillans, endemic
 Restio echinatus Kunth, endemic
 Restio egregius Hochst. endemic
 Restio ejuncidus Mast. endemic
 Restio eleocharis Mast. endemic
 Restio elsieae H.P.Linder, endemic
 Restio esterhuyseniae Pillans, endemic
 Restio exilis Mast. accepted as Restio bifidus Thunb. present
 Restio femineus (Esterh.) H.P.Linder & C.R.Hardy, endemic
 Restio festuciformis Nees ex Mast. endemic
 Restio filicaulis Pillans, accepted as Restio pedicellatus Mast. present
 Restio filiformis Poir. endemic
 Restio fourcadei Pillans, accepted as Restio scaberulus N.E.Br. present
 Restio fragilis Esterh. endemic
 Restio fraternus Kunth, endemic
 Restio fuscidulus Pillans, endemic
 Restio fusiformis Pillans, endemic
 Restio galpinii Pillans, accepted as Platycaulos galpinii (Pillans) H.P.Linder & C.R.Hardy, indigenous
 Restio gaudichaudianus Kunth, endemic
 Restio gossypinus Mast. endemic
 Restio harveyi Mast. endemic
 Restio helenae Mast. endemic
 Restio hyalinus (Mast.) H.P.Linder & C.R.Hardy, endemic
 Restio hystrix Mast. endemic
 Restio implicatus Esterh. endemic
 Restio impolitus Kunth, endemic
 Restio inconspicuus Esterh. endemic
 Restio ingens Esterh. endemic
 Restio insignis Pillans, endemic
 Restio inveteratus Esterh. endemic
 Restio involutus Pillans, accepted as Restio purpurascens Nees ex Mast. endemic
 Restio karooicus (Esterh.) H.P.Linder & C.R.Hardy, endemic
 Restio laniger Kunth, endemic
 Restio leptostachyus Kunth, endemic
 Restio levynsiae (Pillans) H.P.Linder & C.R.Hardy, endemic
 Restio longiaristatus (Pillans ex H.P.Linder) H.P.Linder & C.R.Hardy, endemic
 Restio luxurians (Pillans) H.P.Linder, endemic
 Restio macer Kunth, endemic
 Restio marlothii Pillans, endemic
 Restio micans Nees, endemic
 Restio miser Kunth, endemic
 Restio mkambatiae H.P.Linder, endemic
 Restio monanthos Mast. endemic
 Restio monostylis (Pillans) H.P.Linder & C.R.Hardy, endemic
 Restio montanus Esterh. endemic
 Restio muirii (Pillans) H.P.Linder & C.R.Hardy, endemic
 Restio multiflorus Spreng. endemic
 Restio nanus (Esterh.) H.P.Linder & C.R.Hardy, endemic
 Restio nodosus Pillans, endemic
 Restio nubigenus (Esterh.) H.P.Linder & C.R.Hardy, endemic
 Restio nudiflorus (Pillans) H.P.Linder & C.R.Hardy, endemic
 Restio nuwebergensis Esterh. endemic
 Restio obscurus Pillans, endemic
 Restio occultus (Mast.) Pillans, endemic
 Restio ocreatus Kunth, endemic
 Restio pachystachyus Kunth, endemic
 Restio paludicola H.P.Linder, endemic
 Restio paludosus Pillans, endemic
 Restio paniculatus Rottb. endemic
 Restio papillosus (Esterh.) H.P.Linder & C.R.Hardy, endemic
 Restio papyraceus Pillans, endemic
 Restio parthenocarpos H.P.Linder, endemic
 Restio parviflorus Thunb. accepted as Cannomois parviflora (Thunb.) Pillans, present
 Restio parvispiculus H.P.Linder & C.R.Hardy, endemic
 Restio patens Mast. endemic
 Restio peculiaris Esterh. endemic
 Restio pedicellatus Mast. endemic
 Restio perplexus Kunth, endemic
 Restio perseverans Esterh. endemic
 Restio pillansii H.P.Linder, endemic
 Restio praeacutus Mast. endemic
 Restio pratensis (Esterh.) H.P.Linder & C.R.Hardy, endemic
 Restio pulcher (Esterh.) H.P.Linder & C.R.Hardy, endemic
 Restio pulvinatus Esterh. endemic
 Restio pumilis Esterh. endemic
 Restio purpurascens Nees ex Mast. endemic
 Restio pygmaeus Pillans, endemic
 Restio quadratus Mast. endemic
 Restio quinquefarius Nees, endemic
 Restio ramosissimus H.P.Linder & C.R.Hardy, endemic
 Restio rarus Esterh. endemic
 Restio rigidus (Mast.) H.P.Linder & C.R.Hardy, endemic
 Restio rigoratus (Mast.) H.P.Linder & C.R.Hardy, endemic
 Restio rivulus (Esterh.) H.P.Linder & C.R.Hardy, endemic
 Restio rottboellioides Kunth, endemic
 Restio rudolfii (Pillans) H.P.Linder & C.R.Hardy, endemic
 Restio rupicola Esterh. endemic
 Restio sabulosus Pillans, endemic
 Restio saroclados Mast. endemic
 Restio saxatilis (Esterh.) H.P.Linder & C.R.Hardy, endemic
 Restio scaber Mast. endemic
 Restio scaberulus N.E.Br. endemic
 Restio schoenoides Kunth, indigenous
 Restio secundus (Pillans) H.P.Linder, endemic
 Restio sejunctus Mast. endemic
 Restio setiger Kunth, endemic
 Restio sieberi Kunth, endemic
 Restio similis Pillans, endemic
 Restio singularis Esterh. endemic
 Restio sporadicus (Esterh.) H.P.Linder & C.R.Hardy, endemic
 Restio stereocaulis Mast. endemic
 Restio stokoei Pillans, endemic
 Restio strictus N.E.Br. endemic
 Restio strobolifer Kunth, endemic
 Restio subtilis Mast. endemic
 Restio subverticillatus (Steud.) Mast. endemic
 Restio tenuispicatus H.P.Linder & C.R.Hardy, endemic
 Restio tenuissimus Kunth, endemic
 Restio tetragonus Thunb. endemic
 Restio triflora Rottb. endemic
 Restio triticeus Rottb. endemic
 Restio tuberculatus Pillans, endemic
 Restio uniflorus H.P.Linder, endemic
 Restio unispicatus (H.P.Linder) H.P.Linder & C.R.Hardy, endemic
 Restio vallis-simius H.P.Linder, endemic
 Restio venustulus Kunth, endemic
 Restio verrucosus Esterh. endemic
 Restio versatilis H.P.Linder, endemic
 Restio vilis Kunth, endemic
 Restio villosus H.P.Linder & C.R.Hardy, endemic
 Restio vimineus Rottb. endemic
 Restio virgeus Mast. endemic
 Restio wallichii Mast. endemic
 Restio wittebergensis (Esterh.) H.P.Linder & C.R.Hardy, endemic
 Restio zuluensis H.P.Linder, endemic
 Restio zwartbergensis Pillans, endemic

Rhodocoma
Genus Rhodocoma:
 Rhodocoma alpina H.P.Linder & Vlok, endemic
 Rhodocoma arida H.P.Linder & Vlok, endemic
 Rhodocoma capensis Steud. endemic
 Rhodocoma foliosa (N.E.Br.) H.P.Linder, endemic
 Rhodocoma fruticosa (Thunb.) H.P.Linder, endemic
 Rhodocoma gigantea (Kunth) H.P.Linder, endemic
 Rhodocoma gracilis H.P.Linder & Vlok, endemic
 Rhodocoma vleibergensis H.P.Linder, endemic

Soroveta
Genus Soroveta:
 Soroveta ambigua (Mast.) H.P.Linder & C.R.Hardy, endemic

Staberoha
Genus Staberoha:
 Staberoha aemula (Kunth) Pillans, endemic
 Staberoha banksii Pillans, endemic
 Staberoha cernua (L.f.) T.Durand & Schinz, endemic
 Staberoha distachyos (Rottb.) Kunth, endemic
 Staberoha multispicula Pillans, endemic
 Staberoha ornata Esterh. endemic
 Staberoha remota Pillans, endemic
 Staberoha stokoei Pillans, endemic
 Staberoha vaginata (Thunb.) Pillans, endemic

Thamnochortus
Genus Thamnochortus:
 Thamnochortus acuminatus Pillans, endemic
 Thamnochortus amoena H.P.Linder, endemic
 Thamnochortus arenarius Esterh. endemic
 Thamnochortus bachmannii Mast. endemic
 Thamnochortus cinereus H.P.Linder, endemic
 Thamnochortus dumosus Mast. endemic
 Thamnochortus ellipticus Pillans, endemic
 Thamnochortus erectus (Thunb.) Mast. endemic
 Thamnochortus fraternus Pillans, endemic
 Thamnochortus fruticosus P.J.Bergius, endemic
 Thamnochortus glaber (Mast.) Pillans, endemic
 Thamnochortus gracilis Mast. endemic
 Thamnochortus guthrieae Pillans, endemic
 Thamnochortus insignis Mast. endemic
 Thamnochortus kammanassiae H.P.Linder, endemic
 Thamnochortus karooica H.P.Linder, endemic
 Thamnochortus levynsiae Pillans, endemic
 Thamnochortus lucens (Poir.) H.P.Linder, endemic
 Thamnochortus muirii Pillans, endemic
 Thamnochortus nutans (Thunb.) Pillans, endemic
 Thamnochortus obtusus Pillans, endemic
 Thamnochortus paniculatus Mast. endemic
 Thamnochortus papyraceus Pillans, endemic
 Thamnochortus pellucidus Pillans, endemic
 Thamnochortus platypteris Kunth, endemic
 Thamnochortus pluristachyus Mast. endemic
 Thamnochortus pulcher Pillans, endemic
 Thamnochortus punctatus Pillans, endemic
 Thamnochortus rigidus Esterh. endemic
 Thamnochortus scabridus Pillans, accepted as Thamnochortus schlechteri Pillans, present
 Thamnochortus schlechteri Pillans, endemic
 Thamnochortus spicigerus (Thunb.) Spreng. endemic
 Thamnochortus sporadicus Pillans, endemic
 Thamnochortus stokoei Pillans, endemic

Willdenowia
Genus Willdenowia:
 Willdenowia affinis Pillans, endemic
 Willdenowia arescens Kunth, endemic
 Willdenowia bolusii Pillans, endemic
 Willdenowia glomerata (Thunb.) H.P.Linder, endemic
 Willdenowia humilis Mast. endemic
 Willdenowia incurvata (Thunb.) H.P.Linder, endemic
 Willdenowia pilleata H.P.Linder, indigenous
 Willdenowia purpurea Pillans, endemic
 Willdenowia rugosa Esterh. endemic
 Willdenowia stokoei Pillans, endemic
 Willdenowia sulcata Mast. endemic
 Willdenowia teres Thunb. endemic

Thurniaceae
Family: Thurniaceae,

Prionium
Genus Prionium:
 Prionium serratum (L.f.) Drege ex E.Mey. endemic

Typhaceae
Family: Typhaceae,

Typha
Genus Typha:
 Typha capensis (Rohrb.) N.E.Br. indigenous

Xyridaceae
Family: Xyridaceae,

Xyris
Genus Xyris:
 Xyris anceps Lam. indigenous
 Xyris anceps Lam. var. anceps, indigenous
 Xyris capensis Thunb. indigenous
 Xyris congensis Buttner, indigenous
 Xyris gerrardii N.E.Br. indigenous
 Xyris natalensis L.A.Nilsson, endemic
 Xyris obscura N.E.Br. indigenous
 Xyris rehmannii L.A.Nilsson, indigenous
 Xyris rubella Malme, indigenous

References

South African plant biodiversity lists
Poales